This is a list of foreign players that have played in the Süper Lig. The following players:
have played at least one Süper Lig game for the respective club.
have not been capped for the Turkey national team on any level.
have been born in Turkey and were capped by a foreign national team. This includes players who have dual citizenship with Turkey.

In bold: players that played at least one Süper Lig game in the current season, and the clubs they've played for.

Albania
 Bekim Balaj – Gençlerbirliği 2010–11
 Erjon Bogdani – Gençlerbirliği 1998
 Alban Bushi – Adanaspor, İstanbulspor, Trabzonspor 1999–2005
 Lorik Cana – Galatasaray 2010–11
Endri Cekici – MKE Ankaragücü 2020–
Sokol Cikalleshi – İstanbul Başakşehir, Akhisarspor, Osmanlıspor, Göztepe, Konyaspor 2015–19, 2020–
 Debatik Curri – Gençlerbirliği 2010–13
 Klodian Duro – Samsunspor, Malatyaspor, Çaykur Rizespor 2002–04
 Omar Imeri – Antalyaspor 2020–
 Redi Jupi – Diyarbakırspor 2003–06
 Bekim Kuli – Gençlerbirliği, Samsunspor 1999–2003
 Gilman Lika – Hacettepe, Diyarbakırspor 2008–10
 Agon Mehmeti – Gençlerbirliği 2016–17
 Viktor Paço – Kocaelispor 2002–03
 Florjan Rıza – Adana Demirspor 1991–92
 Altin Rraklli – Diyarbakırspor 2002–03
 Armando Sadiku – BB Erzurumspor 2020–21
 Vioresin Sinani – Kayserispor 2004–05
 Xhevahir Sukaj – Hacettepe 2008
 Admir Teli – Hacettepe 2008

Algeria
Djamel Amani – Aydınspor 1990–93
Fayçal Badji – Erzurumspor 1998–99
Khelifa Belaouchet – Aydınspor 1990–91
Essaïd Belkalem – Trabzonspor 2014–15
Yassine Benzia – Fenerbahçe, Hatayspor – 2018–19, 2021–
Ismaël Bouzid – Galatasaray, MKE Ankaragücü 2007–09
Mohamed Dahmane – Bucaspor 2010–11
Rachid Djebaili – Göztepe 2002–03
Rafik Djebbour – Sivasspor 2013–14
Tahar Cherif El Ouazani – Aydınspor 1990–92
Sofiane Feghouli – Galatasaray 2017–
Houssam Ghacha – Antalyaspor – 2021–
Rachid Ghezzal – Beşiktaş – 2020–
Nabil Ghilas – Gaziantepspor, Göztepe 2016–19
Jugurtha Hamroun – Karabükspor 2012–14
Youssef Haraoui – Karabükspor, Bursaspor, Karşıyaka 1993–96
Noureddine Negazzi – Aydınspor 1991–92
Kamel Kadri – Aydınspor 1992–93
Tarek Lazizi – Gençlerbirliği 1998–99
Khaled Lounici – Aydınspor 1992–93
Raïs M'Bolhi – Antalyaspor 2015–17
Carl Medjani – Trabzonspor, Sivasspor 2014–16
Hamid Merakchi – Gençlerbirliği 1998–2000
Islam Slimani – Fenerbahçe – 2018–19
Mehdi Zeffane – Yeni Malatyaspor 2021–
Karim Ziani – Kayserispor 2010–11

Angola
Isaac Boelua Lokuli – Antalyaspor 2002
Gelson Dala – Antalyaspor 2019–20
Djalma – Kasımpaşa, Konyaspor, Gençlerbirliği 2012–16
Wilson Eduardo – Alanyaspor 2021–
Carlos Fernandes – Bucaspor 2010–11
Fredy – Antalyaspor 2018–
Geraldo – MKE Ankaragücü 2020–
Johnson Macaba – Malatyaspor 2002–04
André Macanga – Gaziantepspor 2004–05
Manucho – Bucaspor, Manisaspor 2010–11

Argentina
Juan Pablo Avendaño – Kayserispor 2007–08
Jerónimo Barrales – Sivasspor 2015–16
Pablo Batalla – Bursaspor 2009–13, 2016–
Fernando Belluschi – Bursaspor 2012–15
Lucas Biglia – Fatih Karagümrük 2020–
Gustavo Blanco Leschuk – Antalyaspor 2019–
Guillermo Burdisso – Galatasaray 2014
Gastón Campi – Trabzonspor 2019–
Franco Cángele – Sakaryaspor, Kayserispor, Elazığspor 2006–14
Héctor Canteros – MKE Ankaragücü 2018–
Alejandro Capurro – Sakaryaspor 2006–07
Marcelo Carrusca – Galatasaray 2006–08
Lucas Castro – Fatih Karagümrük, Adana Demirspor 2020–
Jorge Chaves – Vefa 1971–73
Renato Civelli – Bursaspor 2013–15
Gustavo Colman – Trabzonspor 2008–14
Emmanuel Culio – Galatasaray, Orduspor, Mersin İdmanyurdu 2010–13
Matías Defederico – Eskişehirspor 2015
Matías Delgado – Beşiktaş 2006–10
Emanuel Dening – Yeni Malatyaspor 2017–
Franco Di Santo – Göztepe 2021–
Adrián Domenech – Gençlerbirliği 1989–90
Matías Escobar – Kayserispor 2008
Eber Darío Fernández – Göztepe 1999–2000
Leo Franco – Galatasaray 2009–10
Matías Fritzler – Kasımpaşa 2013–14
Claudio Graf – Sakaryaspor 2007–08
Cristian Guanca – Kasımpaşa 2017
Guido Herrera – Yeni Malatyaspor 2020–21
Federico Higuaín – Beşiktaş 2007
Luis Ibáñez – Trabzonspor 2016–
Leonardo Andrés Iglesias – Kayserispor, MKE Ankaragücü, Bursaspor 2006–10
Emiliano Insúa – Galatasaray 2010–11
Federico Insúa – Bursaspor 2010–11
Vicente Monje – Orduspor 2012–13
 Jorge Montemarani – Vefa 1971–74
Pablo Mouche – Kayserispor 2012–14
Lucas Mugni – Gençlerbirliği 2020–
Osvaldo Nartallo – Beşiktaş, Petrol Ofisi 1993–95
Nicolás Navarro – Kayserispor 2011–12
Hugo Mario Noremberg – Gençlerbirliği 1990–91
Leonel Núñez – Bursaspor 2010–11
Lucas Ontivero – Galatasaray, Gaziantepspor 2014
Ariel Ortega – Fenerbahçe 2002–03
Nehuén Paz – Kayserispor 2020–21
Diego Perotti – Fenerbahçe 2020–21
 Jorge Rinaldi – Gençlerbirliği 1989–90
 Ismael Sosa – Gaziantepspor 2010–12
 Ezequiel Scarione – Kasımpaşa 2013–16
Damián Steinert – Bursaspor 2010–11
 José Sosa – Beşiktaş 2014–16
Javier Umbides – Orduspor 2012–13
Fede Varela – Denizlispor 2020–21
Matías Vargas – Adana Demirspor 2021–
 Valentín Viola – Karabükspor 2014–15
Santiago Vergini – Bursaspor – 2018–19
Lucas Villafáñez – Alanyaspor 2017–
Claudio Zacarias – Gençlerbirliği 1990–91
 Fernando Zuqui – Yeni Malatyaspor 2020–
Christian Zurita – Gaziantepspor, Mersin İdmanyurdu 2006–12

Armenia 
Aras Özbiliz – Beşiktaş 2016–17

Australia
 Tansel Başer – Trabzonspor 1998–2000
Aziz Behich – Bursaspor, İstanbul Başakşehir, Kayserispor, Giresunspor 2013–18, 2019–
 Con Blatsis – Kocaelispor 2002–03
 Kerem Bulut – Akhisar Belediyespor 2013
 Nick Carle – Gençlerbirliği 2007
 Simon Colosimo – Sivasspor 2007
 Bruce Djite – Gençlerbirliği, Diyarbakırspor 2008–10
 Mile Jedinak – Gençlerbirliği, Antalyaspor, İstanbul Başakşehir 2008–11
 Harry Kewell – Galatasaray 2008–11
Awer Mabil – Kasımpaşa 2021–
 Lucas Neill – Galatasaray 2010–11
 Levent Osman – Trabzonspor 2002–03
 Michael Petkovic – Trabzonspor, Sivasspor 2002–10
 Jason Petkovic – Konyaspor 2004–05
 Josip Skoko – Gençlerbirliği 2003–05
 James Troisi – Gençlerbirliği, Kayserispor 2008–12

Austria
Bora Adam – Fatih Karagümrük 2020–21
 Ekrem Dağ – Gaziantepspor, Beşiktaş 2005–14
 Emir Dilaver – Çaykur Rizespor 2020–
 Benjamin Fuchs – Konyaspor 2014–15
 Muhammed Ildiz – Gaziantepspor 2013–17
 Marc Janko – Trabzonspor 2012–14
 Jakob Jantscher – Çaykur Rizespor 2016–18
 Veli Kavlak – Beşiktaş 2011–18
 Tanju Kayhan – Beşiktaş, Mersin İdmanyurdu, Eskişehirspor, Elazığspor, Karabükspor 2011–15
 Ümit Korkmaz – Çaykur Rizespor 2013–16
 Roland Linz – Gaziantepspor 2009–10
 Yasin Pehlivan – Gaziantepspor Bursaspor, Kayseri Erciyesspor 2011–12, 2013–15
 Christian Schandl – Gençlerbirliği 1999–2001
 Srđan Spiridonović – Gençlerbirliği 2020–21
 Peter Zulj – Göztepe, İstanbul Başakşehir 2020–

Azerbaijan
Ufuk Budak – Kayserispor 2016–17
Mahir Emreli – Konyaspor 2022–
 Ali Gökdemir – Elazığspor 2014
 Ilgar Gurbanov – Sivasspor 2007–08
 Ramal Huseynov – Kocaelispor 2008–09
 Vyacheslav Lychkin – Trabzonspor 1996–97
 Cihan Özkara – Sivasspor 2011–12, 2013–14
 Ernani Pereira – Konyaspor, Orduspor, Mersin İdmanyurdu 2003–05, 2007, 2010–11
 Vidadi Rzayev – Erzurumspor 2000
 Mahir Şükürov – Antalyaspor 2004
 Rashad Sadygov – Kayserispor 2005–06, Kocaelispor 2009, Eskişehirspor 2010–11
 Umut Sönmez – Kayserispor 2016–17
 Ramil Sheydayev – Trabzonspor 2016–17
Deniz Yılmaz – Elazığspor, Trabzonspor, Bursaspor, Gençlerbirliği 2013–18

Bahrain
 Jaycee Okwunwanne – Eskişehirspor 2009–11

Belarus
 Alexander Hleb – Konyaspor 2014–15, Gençlerbirliği 2015–2016
Syarhey Kislyak – Gaziantepspor 2016–
Syarhey Palitsevich – Gençlerbirliği 2016–
 Anton Putsila – Gaziantepspor 2015–17
 Artem Radkov – Gençlerbirliği 2014
 Mikalay Ryndzyuk – Gaziantepspor 2001–02
 Maksim Romaschenko – Gaziantepspor, Trabzonspor, Bursaspor 2000–04, 2007–09
 Erik Yakhimovich – Gaziantepspor 2000–02

Belgium
Dino Arslanagić – Göztepe 2021–
Michy Batshuayi – Beşiktaş  2021–
Geoffrey Mujangi Bia – Kayserispor 2017–
Ruud Boffin – Eskişehirspor 2012–16
Boli Bolingoli-Mbombo – İstanbul Başakşehir FK  2020–
Luis Pedro Cavanda – Trabzonspor, Galatasaray 2015–18
Nacer Chadli – İstanbul Başakşehir FK  2020–
Karel D'Haene – Trabzonspor 2003–05
Filip Daems – Gençlerbirliği 2001–05
Ferhat Dogruel
Danilo – Antalyaspor 2016–
Tom De Sutter – Bursaspor 2015–16
Jason Denayer – Galatasaray 2015–16
Ahmet Karadayi – Kardemir Karabükspor 2017–
Fazlı Kocabaş – Kayseri Erciyesspor 2013
Tortol Lumanza Lembi – Osmanlıspor 2017–
Pieter Mbemba – Sivasspor, Bucaspor 2009–10
Muhammed Mert – Hatayspor 2020–
Kevin Mirallas – Gaziantep 2020–21
 Mbo Mpenza – Galatasaray 2001–02
 Jean-Marie Pfaff – Trabzonspor 1989–90
 Rubenilson – Bursaspor 1998–99
 Hans Somers – Trabzonspor 2001–04
 Bernd Thijs – Trabzonspor 2004
Mickaël Tirpan – Kasımpaşa 2019–
Adnan Ugur – Fatih Karagümrük – 2021–
 Jason Vandelannoite – Bursaspor 2007–08
 Björn Vleminckx – Gençlerbirliği, Kayseri Erciyesspor 2012–15
Ali Yaşar – Konyaspor 2019–20

Benin
Fabien Farnolle – Yeni Malatyaspor, BB Erzurumspor 2017–21
Christian Akande Kotchoni – Denizlispor, Kartalspor 2007–09
Damien Chrysostome – Denizlispor 2009–11
Stéphane Sessègnon – Gençlerbirliği 2017–18, 2019–20

Bolivia
 Ronald Gutiérrez – Bursaspor 2008–09
 Ricardo Pedriel – Sivasspor, Mersin İdmanyurdu 2010–13, 2014–16

Bosnia and Herzegovina
 Edin Ademović – Kasımpaşa 2007–08
 Haris Alihodžić – Antalyaspor 1994
 Kemal Alispahić – Kayserispor 1992–94
Marin Aničić – Konyaspor 2019–
 Zlatan Arnautović – Beşiktaş 1983–84
 Alen Avdić – Sakaryaspor 1998
 Branimir Bajić – Denizlispor 2009–10
 Riad Bajić – Konyaspor 2015–17
 Elvir Baljić – Bursaspor, Fenerbahçe, Galatasaray, Konyaspor, MKE Ankaragücü, İstanbulspor 1995–99, 2000–01,  2002–07
 Džemal Berberović – Denizlispor 2009–10
 Elvedin Beganović – Erzurumspor 1998–99
 Ibrahim Begović – Fenerbahçe 1981–83
 Elvir Bolić – Galatasaray, Gaziantepspor, Fenerbahçe İstanbulspor, Gençlerbirliği, Malatyaspor 1992–2000, 2003–06
 Branko Bošnjak – Kayserispor 1985–87
 Dženan Bureković – Göztepe 2020–
 Bego Ćatić – Zeytinburnuspor 1989–92
Edin Cocalić – Akhisarspor 2018–19
 Asim Ferhatović – Fenerbahçe 1963
Amir Hadžiahmetović – Konyaspor 2016–
 Anel Hadžić – Eskişehirspor 2016
 Haris Hajradinović – Kasımpaşa 2018–
 Izet Hajrović – Galatasaray 2014
 Sead Halilagić (Sead Dost) – İstanbulspor, Beşiktaş, Adanaspor 1997–2001, 2002–03
 Irfan Handžic – Zeytinburnuspor 1989–90
 Kenan Hasagić – Gaziantepspor, İstanbul Büyükşehir Belediyespor 2004–12
 Ajdin Hasić – Beşiktaş 2020–
 Armin Hodžić – Kasımpaşa 2020–
 Tarik Hodžić – Galatasaray, Sarıyer 1983–85
 Kenan Horić – Antalyaspor 2016–17
 Demir Hotić – Fenerbahçe 1993
 Damir Ibrić – Gençlerbirliği 2003–04
 Senijad Ibričić – Gaziantepspor, Kasımpaşa, Kayseri Erciyesspor 2012–14
 Sanel Jahić – Karabükspor 2011–13
 Zlatko Juričević – Karşıyaka 1987–92
Goran Karačić – Adanaspor 2016–
 Suad Karalić – Fenerbahçe 1983–84
 Mirsad Kovačević (Mirsad Güneş) – Beşiktaş, Galatasaray, Göztepe 1984–90
 Zvonimir Kožulj – Gaziantep 2020–
 Josip Kvesić – Antalyaspor 2015
Zoran Kvržić – Kayserispor 2019–
 Haris Medunjanin – Gaziantepspor 2012–14
Muris Mešanović – Kayserispor 2019–
 Marko Mihojević – Göztepe 2020–
Deni Milošević – Konyaspor 2016–
 Zvjezdan Misimović – Galatasaray 2010–11
 Samir Muratović – Kocaelispor 1998–99
 Vedin Musić – İstanbulspor, Antalyaspor 1997–2001
 Safet Nadarević – Eskişehirspor 2008–12
 Fahrudin Omerović (Fahrettin Ömerli) – Kocaelispor, İstanbulspor 1992–97
 Rade Paprica – Beşiktaş 1986–87
 Kenan Pirić – Göztepe 2021–
Miralem Pjanić – Beşiktaş 2021–
Ivan Radeljić – Gençlerbirliği, Antalyaspor 2009–12
Amar Rahmanović – Konyaspor 2020–
 Sead Ramović – Sivasspor 2010–11
 Srebrenko Repčić – Fenerbahçe 1983–85
 Sead Sabotić – Adanaspor, MKE Ankaragücü 1989–93
Jasmin Šćuk – BB Erzurumspor 2018–
 Dževad Šećerbegović – Beşiktaş 1983–85
 Ibrahim Šehić – Mersin İdmanyurdu 2011–12
 Mirsad Sejdić – Galatasaray, Bursaspor, Altay, Bkaırköyspor 1981–1988
 Ivan Sesar – Elazığspor 2013, Akhisar Belediyespor 2013–14
 Semir Štilić – Gaziantepspor 2013
 Zijad Švrakić (He has held also Turkey citizenship as "Ziya Yıldız" since 1989) – Adana Demirspor, Galatasaray, Ankaragücü, Karşıyaka 1987–94
 Mirza Varešanović – Bursaspor 2002–05
Edin Višća – İstanbul Başakşehir 2011–13, 2014–
 Ognjen Vranješ – Elazığspor 2014, Gaziantepspor 2014–16
Avdija Vršajević  – Osmanlıspor 2015–
 Ermin Zec – Gençlerbirliği, Balıkesirspor, Karabükspor  2010–15, 2016–17
 Fahrudin Zejnelović – Fenerbahçe 1982
Ervin Zukanović – Fatih Karagümrük 2020–

Brazil

A 
 Abuda – Gaziantepspor 2015–16
 Adriano – Beşiktaş 2016–
 Adriano – Denizlispor, İstanbul Büyükşehir Belediyespor 2006–08
 Adriano Facchini – Karabükspor 2016–17
 Adriano Magrão – Bursaspor 2008
 Adryan – Kayserispor 2019–20
 Aílton – Beşiktaş 2005–06
 Alan – Kasımpaşa 2020–
 Alanzinho – Trabzonspor, Balıkesirspor 2008–13, 2014–15
 Alex – Fenerbahçe 2004–12
 Alex Teixeira – Beşiktaş 2021–
 Alex Telles – Galatasaray 2014–15
 Allano – Bursaspor – 2018–19
 Anderson Talisca – Beşiktaş 2016–
 André (Bahia) – Samsunspor 2011–12
 André (Felipe Ribeiro de Souza) – Gaziantep 2020–21
 André Moritz – Kasımpaşa, Kayserispor, Mersin İdmanyurdu 2007–12
 André Santos (André Clarindo dos Santos) – Fenerbahçe 2009–11
André Santos (André Luís dos Santos) – Gaziantepspor 2002
 Amaral – Beşiktaş 2002–03
 Amilton – Antalyaspor 2018–
 Anderson – Sivasspor, Çaykur Rizespor, Eskişehirspor 2005–09
 Antônio Carlos – Beşiktaş 2002–04
 Artur Moraes  – Osmanlıspor 2015–
 Auremir – Sivasspor 2017–

B 
 Bady – Gençlerbirliği 2017–18
 Baiano – Alanyaspor 2018–
Barbossa Wellington – Kahramanmaraşspor 1988–89
 Beto – Gaziantepspor, Bucaspor, Mersin İdmanyurdu 2008–12
 Bobô – Beşiktaş, Kayserispor 2005–15
 Bruno Mezenga – Orduspor, Akhisar Belediyespor 2012–16
 Bruno Mota – Gaziantepspor 2016–
Bruno Peres – Trabzonspor 2021–

C 
 Capone – Galatasaray, Kocaelispor 1999–2003
 Carlos Alberto – Denizlispor 2007–09
 Carlos Ninja Rodrigo – Çaykur Rizespor 2008–10
 César Prates – Galatasaray 2003–04
 Charles – Antalyaspor 2016–
 Chico – Gaziantepspor, Antalyaspor 2014–20
 Christian – Galatasaray 2002–03
 Serginho Chulapa – Malatyaspor 1988–89
 Cicinho – Sivasspor 2013–16
 Claudemir – Sivasspor 2019–
 Cláudio Taffarel – Galatasaray 1998–2001
 Cleyton – Kayserispor 2012–14
 Cris – Galatasaray 2012
 Cristian Baroni – Fenerbahçe 2009–14
 Costudio Toledo – Denizlispor 1987–88

D 
Daniel Rezende – Bursaspor 2009–10
Danilo Bueno – Mersin İdmanyurdu 2012
David Braz – Sivasspor – 2018–
Davidson – Alanyaspor 2020–22
Dedê – Eskişehirspor 2011–14
Deivid – Fenerbahçe 2006–10
Dentinho – Beşiktaş 2013
Derley – Kayserispor 2015–16
Diego – Fenerbahçe 2014–16
Djalma Bastos de Oliveira – Boluspor 1988–90
 Didi – Adanaspor 2016–17
 Diego Ângelo – Eskişehirspor, Antalyaspor 2010–
 Diego Lima – Akhisar Belediyespor 2012–13
 Diego Lopes – Kayserispor 2015–16
 Digão – Adanaspor 2016–17
 Doka Madureira – İstanbul Başakşehir 2011–13, 2014–
 Dória – Yeni Malatyaspor 2017–18
 Douglão – Akhisar Belediyespor 2014–16
 Douglas (Chagas Matos) – Alanyaspor – 2017–18
 Douglas (Franco Teixeira) – Trabzonspor 2015–16
Douglas (Pereira dos Santos) – Sivasspor, Beşiktaş – 2018–
Douglas (Silva Bacelar) – Giresunspor 2021–
Dyego Rocha Coelho – Karabükspor 2011

E 
 Éder – Malatyaspor 1988
 Edgar Silva – Adanaspor 2016–
 Edu – Beşiktaş 2011–12
Edu Dracena – Fenerbahçe 2006–09
 Eduardo (Ferreira Abdo Pacheco) – Gaziantepspor 2008–09
 Eduardo (Suisso De Novaes) – Trabzonspor 2001–02
 Elano – Galatasaray 2009–10
 Emerson – Trabzonspor 2012–13

F 
 Fabiano (Eller) – Trabzonspor 2005–06
 Fabiano (Leismann) – Denizlispor 2021–
 Fabiano (Lima Rodrigues) – Fenerbahçe 2004–05
 Fábio Bilica – Sivasspor, Fenerbahçe, Elazığspor 2008–14
 Fábio Luciano – Fenerbahçe 2003–06
 Fábio Pinto – Galatasaray 2002–03
 Fabrício Baiano – Gençlerbirliği 2019–
 Felipe – Galatasaray 2002–03
 Felipe Melo – Galatasaray 2011–15
 Fernandão – Bursaspor, Fenerbahçe 2013–
 Fernando (Andrade dos Santos) – Sivasspor – 2019–
 Fernando (Boldrin) – Kayserispor 2017–
 Fernando (Lucas Martins) – Antalyaspor – 2021–
 Fernando (Francisco Reges Mouta) – Galatasaray 2017–19
 Fernando Filho – Zeytinburnuspor 1990–91
 Filipe Augusto – Alanyaspor – 2017–
 Flávio Conceição – Galatasaray 2004–05
 Flávio Medeiros – Trabzonspor, Giresunspor – 2020–
 Flávio Ramos – Gençlerbirliği 2019–
Francisco Lima – Gaziantepspor 1996–98

G 
 Gabriel – Manisaspor 2009–10
 Carlos Roberto Gallo – Malatyaspor 1988–90
 Gérson – Fenerbahçe, İstanbulspor 1991–93, 1996–97
 Giuliano – Fenerbahçe 2017–
 Gökçek Vederson – Ankaraspor, Fenerbahçe, Bursaspor, Antalyaspor, Mersin İdmanyurdu 2003–16
 Gralak – İstanbulspor 1998–2001
 Guilherme (Costa Marques) – Yeni Malatyaspor, Trabzonspor 2018–
 Guilherme (Haubert Sityá) – Konyaspor 2019–
 Guilherme (Milhomem Gusmão) – Antalyaspor 2015–16
Gustavo Assunção – Galatasaray 2021–
Gustavo Campanharo – Kayserispor 2019–

I 

 Ivan – Gaziantepspor, Mersin İdmanyurdu 2008–13

J 

 Jabá – Ankaraspor, MKE Ankaragücü 2003–06, 2007–09
 Jailson – Fenerbahçe 2018–
 Jaílton Paraíba – Gençlerbirliği 2017–
 Jajá – Trabzonspor, Kayserispor 2010–11, 2012–13
 Jô – Galatasaray 2009–10
 João Batista (Mertol Karatay) – Gaziantepspor, Galatasaray, Konyaspor 1996–97, 2000–01, 2002–04, 2005–09
 João Figueiredo – Gaziantep 2021–
 João Vitor – Gaziantepspor 2015
 Jefferson (de Oliveira Galvão) – Trabzonspor, Konyaspor 2005–09
 Jefferson (Nogueira Júnior) – Gaziantep 2019–
 Jones Carioca – Karabükspor 2014
 Júlio César (António de Souza) – Gaziantepspor, Samsunspor, Kayseri Erciyesspor 2001–05
 Júlio César (Mendes Moreira) – Denizlispor, Kocaelispor 2006–09
 Júlio César (Santos Correa) – Gaziantepspor 2008–10
 Juninho Cearense – Samsunspor 2003
 Júnior – Bursaspor 2002–03
 Júnior Morais – Gaziantep 2019–

K 
 Kadu – Göztepe 2017–
 Kahê – Gençlerbirliği, Manisaspor, Denizlispor, Karşıyaka 2007–15
 Kauê – Konyaspor 2003–10
 Kléberson – Beşiktaş 2005–07

L 
Leandrinho – Sivasspor, Karabükspor 2017–18
Leandro – Bursaspor 2008
Leandro Rodríguez – Çaykur Rizespor 2007–08
Léo Duarte – İstanbul Başakşehir 2020–
Lincoln – Galatasaray 2007–09
Lourency – Göztepe 2021–
Luan Scapolan – Akhisar Belediyespor 2014–15
Lucas Lima – İstanbul Başakşehir 2021–
Luiz Adriano – Antalyaspor 2021–
Luiz Gustavo – Fenerbahçe 2019–
Luiz Henrique – MKE Ankaragücü, Kasımpaşa 2008–11

M 
 Maicon (Marques) – Antalyaspor 2017–
 Maicon (Pereira Roque) – Galatasaray 2017–19
 Marçal – Gaziantepspor 2015–16
 Marcão – Galatasaray 2018–
 Marcelinho Paraíba – Trabzonspor 2006
 Marcelinho Rodrigues – Bursaspor 2008
 Marcelo – Beşiktaş 2016–17
 Marcelo Goiano – Sivasspor 2019–
 Márcio – Galatasaray 1999–2001
 Marcio Jarro – Trabzonspor 2001–02
 Marcello Thomas Monteiro – Gaziantepspor 1990–96
 Márcio Mossoró – İstanbul Başakşehir, Göztepe 2014–21
 Marcus Vinícius Cesário – İstanbul Büyükşehir Belediyespor 2007–13
 Mariano – Galatasaray 2017–20
 Mário Jardel – Galatasaray 2000–01
 Marlon Xavier – Trabzonspor 2020–21
 Marquinhos – Çaykur Rizespor, İstanbul Büyükşehir Belediyespor 2007–11
 Mateus Alonso Honorio – MKE Ankaragücü 2007–09
 Maurício Ramos – Adanaspor, Çaykur Rizespor 2016–18
 Mert Nobre – Fenerbahçe, Beşiktaş, Mersin İdmanyurdu, Kayserispor 2004–15

N 
 Naldo – Antalyaspor 2020–

P 
 Pablo Santos – Hatayspor 2020–21
 Paulino Miranda – Kahramanmaraşspor 1988–90
 Paulo Henrique – Trabzonspor 2011–14
 Paulo Pimentel – Denizlispor 2003–06
 Pedro Henrique – Kayserispor, Sivasspor 2019–
 Pedro Oldoni – Sivasspor 2014

R 
Rafael (Mariano) – Manisaspor 2006–08
Rafael (Pereira da Silva) – İstanbul Başakşehir 2020–21
Ramon Motta – Beşiktaş, Antalyaspor 2013–
Renan Diniz – Adanaspor 2016–
Renan Foguinho – Adanaspor 2016–
Renato Cajá – Bursaspor 2014
Reynaldo – Adanaspor Kulübü 2017
Rhodolfo – Beşiktaş 2015–17
Ricardinho – Beşiktaş 2006–08
Ricardo – Ankaragücü 2019–
Roberto Carlos – Fenerbahçe 2007–10
Robinho – Sivasspor, Istanbul Basaksehir 2017–
Robson – Trabzonspor 2001–02
Rodrigo Tabata – Gaziantepspor, Beşiktaş 2008–10
Rogério – Antalyaspor, Göztepe 1998–2000
Rogério Oliveira – Trabzonspor, Vanspor 1999–2000
Ronaldo – Beşiktaş 2001–05
Ronaldo Mendes – Çaykur Rizespor 2021–
Roni – Adanaspor 2016–
Rovérsio – Orduspor 2012–13

S 
Sandro (da Silva Mendonça) – Hacettepe, Gençlerbirliği, Sivasspor 2007–10, 2011–12
Sandro (Raniere Guimarães Cordeiro) – Antalyaspor 2017–18
Sandro Lima – Gençlerbirliği 2020–
Serginho (Sérgio Antônio Borges Júnior) – Akhisar Belediyespor 2017–
Serginho (Sérgio Antônio Soler de Oliveira Júnior) – Giresunspor 2021–
Sérgio Neves – Fenerbahçe, Sakaryaspor 1998–99
Sérgio Oliveira – Sivasspor 2008–09
Sidnei – Beşiktaş 2011–12
Simão – Fenerbahçe, MKE Ankaragücü 2002–03
Jorge Luiz Sousa – Gaziantepspor 2009–11
Souza – Fenerbahçe, Beşiktaş 2015–18, 2020–

T 
 Tadeu – Bursaspor 2009–10
 Thaciano – Altay 2021–
 Thuram – Konyaspor 2019–
 Tita – Ankaraspor, MKE Ankaragücü, Antalyaspor, Mersin İdmanyurdu 2004–07, 2008–
 Titi – Kasımpaşa 2015–17
 Tom – İstanbul Büyükşehir Belediyespor 2012–13, 2014
 Tozo – Hacettepe, Gençlerbirliği, Karabükspor 2007–11

V 
 Vágner Love – Alanyaspor, Beşiktaş 2016–19
 Valdomiro – Samsunspor 2011–12
 Vinicius Oliveira – Kahramanmaraşspor 1988–90
 Viola – Gaziantepspor 2002–03
 Vitor Hugo – Trabzonspor 2020–

W 
Wágner – Gaziantepspor 2010–12
Wallace (Fortuna dos Santos) – Yeni Malatyaspor 2020–22
Wallace (Machado da Silva) – Sarıyer 1988–91
Washington – Fenerbahçe 2001–02
Washington Mascarenhas – Konyaspor 2008
Welinton – Alanyaspor, Beşiktaş – 2017–
Welliton – Mersin İdmanyurdu, Kayserispor 2014–17
William – Kayserispor 2016
Wílton Figueiredo – Gaziantepspor 2013

Y 

 Yan Sasse – Çaykur Rizespor 2019–

Bulgaria
 Emil Angelov – Denizlispor, Karabükspor 2009–11
 Dimcho Belyakov – Gaziantepspor 1998
 Vasil Bozhikov– Kasımpaşa 2015–17
 Ivan Cvetkov – Sivasspor 2006–08
 Nikolay Dimitrov – Kasımpaşa 2010–12
 Doncho Donev – Sarıyer, Vanspor, Denizlispor 1996–2000
 Ivko Ganchev – Bursaspor, Çaykur Rizespor 1992–2000
 Iliya Gruev – Altay 1992–93, 1994–95
 Ilian Iliev – Altay 1993–94
 Ismail Isa – Karabükspor 2011–12
 Dimitar Ivankov – Kayserispor, Bursaspor 2005–11
 Ruzhin Kerimov – Altay 1986–87
 Rosen Kirilov – Adanaspor 1999–2001
 Radostin Kishishev – Bursaspor 1997–98
 Emil Kostadinov – Fenerbahçe 1996–97
 Zdravko Lazarov – Kocaelispor, Gaziantepspor, Kayseri Erciyesspor 2000–07
 Yordan Letchkov – Beşiktaş 1997–98
 Georgi Markov – Trabzonspor 2002
 Veselin Minev – Antalyaspor 2011–12
 Nikolay Mihaylov – Mersin İdmanyurdu 2014–2016
 Nesim Özgür – Galatasaray, İstanbulspor, Trabzonspor, Malatyaspor 1991–2002
 Slavcho Pavlov – Kayserispor 1994–96
 Predrag Pažin – Kocaelispor 2000–02
 Ivaylo Petkov – İstanbulspor, Fenerbahçe 2002–04
 Ivelin Popov – Gaziantepspor 2010–12
Strahil Popov – Kasımpaşa, Hatayspor 2015–
 Dimitar Rangelov – Konyaspor 2014–17
 Vladko Shalamanov – Altay 1996–97
 Georgi Sarmov – Kasımpaşa 2010–11, 2012–13
 Stanimir Stoilov – Fenerbahçe 1992–93
 Nikolay Todorov – Sarıyer 1996–97
 Iliya Valov – Karşıyaka, Denizlispor 1992–95
 Kostadin Vidolov – Bursaspor 1997–2000
 Todor Yanchev – Trabzonspor 2001
 Zlatko Yankov – Beşiktaş, Adanaspor, Vanspor, Gençlerbirliği 1996–2000
 Alex Yordanov – Kocaelispor, İstanbulspor, Kayserispor, Konyaspor, MKE Ankaragücü 2000–06
 Zdravko Zdravkov – İstanbulspor, Adanaspor, Çaykur Rizespor 1997–2002, 2004–07

Burkina Faso
 Aristide Bancé – Samsunspor 2011–12
Bryan Dabo – Çaykur Rizespor 2021–
 Mahamoudou Kéré – Konyaspor 2010–11
Bakary Koné – MKE Ankaragücü 2018–
 Djakaridja Koné – Sivasspor 2015–16
 Préjuce Nakoulma – Mersin İdmanyurdu, Kayserispor 2014–17
Jospin Nshimirimana – Yeni Malatyaspor – 2021–
 Rahim Ouédraogo – Manisaspor 2009–10
Abdou Razack Traoré – Gaziantepspor, Karabükspor, Konyaspor 2013–
 Bakary Soro  – Osmanlıspor 2015–16
 Abdoulaye Soulama Traoré – Denizlispor 2000–02
 Alain Traoré – Kayserispor 2016–17
 Lamine Traoré – Gençlerbirliği 2006–09

Burundi
Eric Ndizeye – Yeni Malatyaspor 2020–
Faty Papy – Trabzonspor 2009
Youssouf Ndayishimiye – Yeni Malatyaspor, İstanbul Başakşehir 2019–
Jospin Nshimirimana – Yeni Malatyaspor 2021–
Saidi Ntibazonkiza – Akhisar Belediyespor 2014–15

Cameroon
 Vincent Aboubakar – Beşiktaş 2016–17, 2020–21
 Gustave Bebbe – Konyaspor, MKE Ankaragücü, İstanbul Büyükşehir Belediyespor, Diyarbakırspor, Kasımpaşa 2005–06, 2007–11
 Severin Brice Bikoko – Akhisar Belediyespor 2012
 Jean-Claude Billong – Hatayspor 2020–21
 Gilles Binya – Gaziantepspor 2011–15
 Alioum Boukar (Ali Uyanık) – Samsunspor, İstanbulspor, Konyaspor 1995–2005, 2008–10
 Henri Bienvenu – Fenerbahçe, Eskişehirspor  2011–12, 2013–14
 Sacha Boey – Galatasaray 2021–
 Joseph Boum – Mersin İdmanyurdu, Antalyaspor 2011–14
 Petrus Boumal – BB Erzurumpsor 2020–
 Ghislain Lazare Chameni – Altay 2002–03
Aurélien Chedjou – Galatasaray, İstanbul Başakşehir, Bursaspor, Adana Demirspor 2013–19, 2021–
 Armand Deumi – Gaziantepspor, Karabükspor 2007–13
 Arnaud Djoum – Akhisar Belediyespor 2014–15
 Lionel Enguene – Antalyaspor 2016
 Mbilla Etame – Antalyaspor, Alanyaspor 2015–19
 Samuel Eto'o – Antalyaspor 2015–18
 Franck Etoundi – Kasımpaşa 2015–17
 Francis Mbonjo Etouke – Adanaspor 2000
 Souleymanou Hamidou – Çaykur Rizespor, Denizlispor, Kayserispor 2000–02, 2003–11
 Charles Itandje – Konyaspor, Çaykur Rizespor, Gaziantepspor 2013–14, 2015–17
 Joseph-Désiré Job – Diyarbakırspor 2009–10
 Raymond Kalla – Sivasspor 2005–06
 Carlos Kameni – Fenerbahçe 2017–18
 Jean-Armel Kana-Biyik – Kayserispor, Gaziantep 2016–
 Marc Kibong Mbamba – Konyaspor 2013–14
 Dorge Kouemaha – Gaziantepspor 2013
 Wato Kuaté – Akhisar Belediyespor 2014
 Léonard Kweuke – Çaykur Rizespor 2013–17
 Georges Mandjeck – Kayseri Erciyesspor 2013–15
 Jean-Jacques Missé-Missé – Trabzonspor 1997
 Sammy N'Djock – Antalyaspor 2010–13
Landry N'Guémo – Akhisar Belediyespor, Kayserispor 2015–17
 Geremi Njitap – Gençlerbirliği, MKE Ankaragücü  1997–99, 2010
 Dany Nounkeu – Gaziantepspor, Galatasaray, Beşiktaş, Bursaspor, Karabükspor, Akhisar Belediyespor 2010–14, 2015–19
 Joseph Desire Mawaye – Kasımpaşa 2008–09
 Jean Makoun – Antalyaspor 2015–17
 Stéphane Mbia – Trabzonspor 2015–16
 Jacques Momha – Gençlerbirliği, Diyarbakırspor, Manisaspor 2008–11
Georges-Kévin Nkoudou – Beşiktaş 2019–
 Paul-Georges Ntep – Kayserispor 2019–20
 Salomon Olembé – Kayserispor 2008–09
 Jean-Emmanuel Effa Owona – Elazığspor, MKE Ankaragücü 2002–04
 Alioum Saidou – İstanbulspor, Galatasaray, Kayserispor, Sivasspor 2002–06, 2007–09, 2010–11
 Rigobert Song – Galatasaray, Trabzonspor 2004–10
 Adolphe Teikeu – BB Erzurumspor 2020–
 Hervé Tum – Bursaspor, Sivasspor, İstanbul Büyükşehir Belediyespor, Gençlerbirliği, Elazığspor 2007–12
 Pierre Webó – İstanbul Büyükşehir Belediyespor, Fenerbahçe, Osmanlıspor 2011–17
 Jacques Zoua – Kayseri Erciyesspor 2014–15

Canada
Sam Adekugbe – Hatayspor, Galatasaray 2021–
 Milan Borjan – Sivasspor 2011–14
Atiba Hutchinson – Beşiktaş 2013–
 Michael Klukowski – MKE Ankaragücü, Manisaspor 2010–12
Cyle Larin – Beşiktaş 2017–19, 2020–22
 Josh Simpson – Manisaspor 2009–12

Cape Verde
Bébé – Beşiktaş 2011–12
 Dady – Bucaspor 2010–11
Djaniny – Trabzonspor 2020–
Ricardo Gomes – BB Erzurumpsor 2020–
 Kuca – Karabükspor 2015
Ryan Mendes – Kayserispor 2017–18
 Sandro Mendes – Manisaspor 2005
 Néné – Çaykur Rizespor 2003–04
Carlos Ponck – İstanbul Başakşehir 2019–
Garry Rodrigues – Galatasaray, Fenerbahçe S.K. 2016–20

Central African Republic 
 Habib Habibou – Gaziantepspor 2016

Chad
Ezechiel N'Douassel – Konyaspor 2013–14
Casimir Ninga – Sivasspor 2020–21

Chile
Gonzalo Espinoza – Kayserispor 2017–18
Júnior Fernándes – Alanyaspor, İstanbul Başakşehir 2017–
Mauricio Isla – Fenerbahçe 2017–20
 Claudio Maldonado – Fenerbahçe 2008–09
Cristóbal Jorquera – Eskişehirspor, Bursaspor 2013–14, 2015–18
Gary Medel – Beşiktaş 2017–20
 Manuel Neira – Gaziantepspor 2007–08
 Nicolás Peric – Gençlerbirliği 2007–09
 César Pinares – Altay 2021–
 Erick Pulgar – Galatasaray 2021–
 Sebastián Pinto – Bursaspor, Eskişehirspor 2011–14, 2015–16
Martín Rodríguez – Hatayspor 2021–
Enzo Roco – Beşiktaş, Fatih Karagümrük 2018–
Ángelo Sagal – Denizlispor, Gaziantep 2020–
 Rodrigo Tello – Beşiktaş, Eskişehirspor, Elazığspor 2007–14

Colombia
Cristian Borja – Alanyaspor 2021–22
Fabián Castillo – Trabzonspor 2016–18
Óscar Córdoba – Beşiktaş, Antalyaspor 2002–07
Álvaro Domínguez – Samsunspor 2011–12
Oscar Estupiñán – Denizlispor 2019–20
Radamel Falcao – Galatasaray 2019–22
Pedro Franco – Beşiktaş 2014–16
David González – Çaykur Rizespor 2007–08
Jersson González – Galatasaray 2001–02
Teófilo Gutiérrez – Trabzonspor 2010–11
Luís Martínez – Sakaryaspor, Manisaspor 2006, 2008–09
Faryd Mondragón – Galatasaray 2001–07
Johnnier Montaño – Konyaspor 2010–11
Marlos Moreno – Konyaspor 2022–
Alexis Pérez – Giresunspor 2021–
Juan Pablo Pino – Galatasaray 2010–11
Rubiel Quintana – Çaykur Rizespor 2003–04
Michael Rangel – Kasımpaşa 2017–18
Hugo Rodallega – Akhisar Belediyespor, Trabzonspor, Denizlispor 2015–21
Gustavo Victoria – Galatasaray, Gaziantepspor, Çaykur Rizespor 2001–03, 2005–08
Róbinson Zapata – Galatasaray 2010–11

Comoros 
Ali Ahamada – Kayserispor 2016–18

Costa Rica

Esteban Alvarado – Trabzonspor 2015–
Hansell Araúz – Kayseri Erciyesspor 2013
Randall Azofeifa – Gençlerbirliği, Kayseri Erciyesspor 2011–14
Celso Borges – Göztepe – 2018–

Côte d'Ivoire
 Sam Dominique Abouo – Siirtspor 2000–01
 Stephane Acka – BB Erzurumspor 2018–19
Serge Arnaud Aka – Altay 2021–
 Davy Claude Angan – Gaziantepspor 2016–17
 Daouda Bamba – Altay 2021–
 Sol Bamba – Trabzonspor 2012–13
 Yacouba Bamba – Diyarbakırspor 2004–05
 Kafoumba Coulibaly – Kasımpaşa 2012–14
Cyriac – Sivasspor 2017–19
Simon Deli – Adana Demirspor 2021–
 Serge Dié – Kayseri Erciyesspor 2005–07
Brice Dja Djédjé – MKE Ankaragücü, Kayserispor 2018–20
Serge Djiehoua – Antalyaspor 2008–11
Ismaël Diomandé – Çaykur Rizespor, Konyaspor 2019–21
Didier Drogba – Galatasaray 2013–14
Jean-Armel Drolé – Antalyaspor 2017
Emmanuel Eboué – Galatasaray 2011–14
Moryké Fofana – Konyaspor, Yeni Malatyaspor 2016–
Gervinho – Trabzonspor 2021–
Gerard Gohou – Kasımpaşa 2019–
Jean-Jacques Gosso – Orduspor, Mersin İdmanyurdu, Gençlerbirliği SK 2011–15
Max Gradel – Sivasspor 2020–
Kader Keïta – Galatasaray 2009–10
Arouna Koné – Sivasspor 2017–
Moussa Koné – BB Erzurumspor 2018–19
Jean Evrard Kouassi – Trabzonspor 2021–
Jean Seri – Galatasaray 2019–20
Giovanni Sio – Gençlerbirliği 2019–
Ibrahim Sissoko – Eskişehirspor, Konyaspor 2014–16
Adama Traoré – Göztepe 2017–19
Ousmane Viera – Çaykur Rizespor, Adanaspor 2013–17
 Didier Zokora – Trabzonspor, Akhisar Belediyespor 2011–15

Croatia
Kristijan Bistrović – Kasımpaşa 2020–
Josip Bulat – Bursaspor 2002–03
Hrvoje Čale – Trabzonspor 2008–11
Damjan Đoković – Çaykur Rizespor 2020–
Josip Duvančić – İzmirspor 1966–67
Tomislav Erceg – Kocaelispor 2001
Petar Filipović – Konyaspor 2017–19
Antonio Franja – Bursaspor 2002–03
Drago Gabrić – Trabzonspor 2009–10, MKE Ankaragücü 2010–11
Igor Gal – Çaykur Rizespor 2007–08
Tomislav Glumac – Balıkesirspor 2015
Vanja Iveša – Eskişehirspor 2008–12, Elazığspor 2012–14
Elvis Kokalović – Konyaspor 2013–15
Ante Kulušić – Hacettepe 2009, Gençlerbirliği 2010–14, 2015–17, Balıkesirspor 2014–15
Jerko Leko – Bucaspor 2010–11
Krunoslav Lovrek – Eskişehirspor 2008–09
Anton Maglica – Kayserispor 2020–21
Dario Melnjak – Çaykur Rizespor 2019–
Matej Mitrović – Beşiktaş 2017–18
Marijan Mrmić – Beşiktaş 1996–98
Karlo Muhar – Kayserispor 2020–
Stipe Perica – Kasımpaşa 2018–19
Stjepan Poljak – Eskişehirspor 2008–09
Srebrenko Posavec – MKE Ankaragücü 2006–07
Milan Rapaić – Fenerbahçe 2000–03
Vedran Runje – Beşiktaş 2006–07
Gordon Schildenfeld – Beşiktaş 2008
Zvonimir Šarlija – Kasımpaşa 2019–
Anthony Šerić – Beşiktaş, Karabükspor 2007–08, 2010–13
Mario Šitum – Kayserispor 2019–
Hrvoje Spahija – Elazığspor 2012–13
Robert Špehar – Galatasaray 2001–02
Dragan Talajić – Zeytinburnuspor 1994–95
Stjepan Tomas – Fenerbahçe, Galatasaray, Gaziantepspor, Bucaspor 2003–07, 2009–11
Vjekoslav Tomić – Karabükspor 2010–13
Domagoj Vida – Beşiktaş – 2017–
Jurica Vranješ – Gençlerbirliği 2010
Luka Vučko – Eskişehirspor 2008–11
Davor Vugrinec – Trabzonspor 1997–00
Andrija Vuković – Balıkesirspor 2015
Nikola Žižić – Antalyaspor 2012–13

Cyprus
 Dossa Júnior – Konyaspor, Eskişehirspor 2015–16

Czech Republic
 Tomáš Abrahám – Denizlispor 2005–09
 Milan Baroš – Galatasaray 2008–13, Antalyaspor 2013
 David Bičík – Mersin İdmanyurdu 2013
 Roman Bednář – MKE Ankaragücü 2011
 Jakub Brabec – Çaykur Rizespor 2018–19
Tomáš Břečka – Kasımpaşa 2019–
 Jaroslav Černý – MKE Ankaragücü 2011
 Tomáš Borek – Konyaspor 2013–14
 Erich Brabec – Konyaspor, Ankaraspor, MKE Ankaragücü 2004–05, 2008–10
Ondřej Čelůstka – Trabzonspor, Antalyaspor 2011–13, 2015–20
 Milan Černý – Sivasspor 2011–12
 Bořek Dočkal – Konyaspor 2010–11
 Radek Dosoudil – Denizlispor 2005
 Josef Dvorník – Manisaspor 2007–08
 Marek Heinz – Galatasaray 2005–06
 Jiří Homola – Malatyaspor 2005–06
 Martin Horák – Denizlispor 2005
 Pavel Horváth – Galatasaray 2001–02
 Petr Janda – Antalyaspor 2012–13
 Rostislav Jeřábek – Adanaspor, Konyaspor 1990–93
 Petr Johana – Manisaspor 2005–06
 Tomáš Jun – Trabzonspor, Beşiktaş 2004–06
 Michal Kadlec – Fenerbahçe 2013–16
 Martin Klein – Konyaspor 2010–11
 Daniel Kolář – Gaziantepspor 2016–17
 Jiří Mašek – MKE Ankaragücü 2007–08
 Michal Meduna – Manisaspor 2005–07
 Tomáš Michálek – Malatyaspor 2006
 Jakub Navrátil – Sivasspor 2011–14
Tomáš Necid – Bursaspor 2015–17, 2018–
Filip Novák – Trabzonspor, Fenerbahçe 2017–
David Pavelka – Kasımpaşa 2015–21
 Tomáš Pešír – Kayserispor 2005
 Adam Petrouš – Ankaraspor 2006–07
Václav Procházka – Osmanlıspor 2016–18
 Karel Rada – Trabzonspor 1997–98
 Tomáš Rada – Sivasspor 2011–12
 Jan Rajnoch – MKE Ankaragücü, Sivasspor  2010–11, 2012–13
 František Rajtoral – Gaziantepspor 2016–17
 Zdeněk Šenkeřík – Malatyaspor 2006–07
 Tomáš Sivok – Beşiktaş, Bursaspor 2008–17
Milan Škoda – Çaykur Rizespor 2019–
Josef Šural – Alanyaspor 2018–19
Michal Trávník – Kasımpaşa 2021–
 Tomáš Ujfaluši – Galatasaray 2011–13
 Ondřej Vaněk – Kayserispor 2014
 Tomáš Zápotočný – Beşiktaş, Bursaspor, Beşiktaş 2008–11
 Luděk Zdráhal – Göztepe 1999–2000
 Lukáš Zelenka – Manisaspor 2005–08
 Zdeněk Zlámal – Alanyaspor 2016–17

Democratic Republic of the Congo
Benik Afobe – Trabzonspor  2020–21
Britt Assombalonga – Adana Demirspor  2021–
Cédric Bakambu – Bursaspor 2014–15
Musemestre Bamba – Denizlispor 1994–95
Jeremy Bokila – Eskişehirspor 2016
Yannick Bolasie – Çaykur Rizespor 2021–
Jonathan Bolingi – MKE Ankaragücü 2020–
Théo Bongonda – Trabzonspor – 2017–18
Walter Bwalya – Yeni Malatyaspor  2021–22
Nill De Pauw – Çaykur Rizespor 2019–20
Hervé Kage – Karabükspor 2017–18
 N'Dayi Kalenga (born 1967) – MKE Ankaragücü, Altay 1994–98
 N'Dayi Kalenga (born 1978) – Kayserispor,  Kardemir Karabükspor, Göztepe 1997–99, 2002–03
 Bunene Ngaduane – MKE Ankaragücü 1995–96
 Andre Kona – Gençlerbirliği, Antalyaspor, Diyarbakırspor, İstanbulspor 1993–2003
 Domi Kumbela – Karabükspor 2014–15
 Lomana LuaLua – Karabükspor, Çaykur Rizespor, Akhisar Belediyespor 2012–13, 2014–16
Jody Lukoki – Yeni Malatyaspor 2020–21
Ali Lukunku – Galatasaray 2002–04
Christian Luyindama – Galatasaray 2018–
 Larrys Mabiala – Karabükspor, Kayserispor 2012–17
 Cédric Makiadi – Çaykur Rizespor 2015–16
 Harrison Manzala – Kayserispor 2020–21
 Nsumbu Mazuwa – Kocaelispor, İstanbul Büyükşehir Belediyespor 2008–09, 2009–11
 Marcel Mbayo – Gençlerbirliği, Malatyaspor 2000–04
Wilfred Moke – Konyaspor, MKE Ankaragücü 2017– 
 Cédric Mongongu – Eskişehirspor – 2015
Paul-José M'Poku – Konyaspor – 2021–
Jackson Muleka – Kasımpaşa 2021–
 Landry Mulemo – Bucaspor – 2010–11
 Joachim Mununga – Gençlerbirliği 2011–12
Fabrice N'Sakala – Alanyaspor 2016–
Dieumerci Ndongala – Kasımpaşa 2019–
 Shabani Nonda – Galatasaray 2007–10
 Marcel Tisserand – Fenerbahçe 2020–
 Nzuzi Toko – Eskişehirspor 2015

Denmark
Jens Berthel Askou – Kasımpaşa 2007–09
Oğuz Han Aynaoğlu – Bursaspor, Çaykur Rizespor 2013–14, 2016–17
Andreas Cornelius – Trabzonspor 2021–
Thomas Dalgaard – Manisaspor 2007–08
Jes Høgh – Fenerbahçe 1995–99
Jens Jønsson – Konyaspor 2016–20
Mathias Jørgensen – Fenerbahçe 2019–20
Nicolai Jørgensen – Kasımpaşa 2021–
Christian Keller – Kasımpaşa 2009–11
Peter Kjaer – Beşiktaş 2001
Simon Kjær – Fenerbahçe 2015–17
Andreas Maxsø – Osmanlispor 2017–18
John Nielsen – Göztepe 1969–71
Henrik Nielsen – Fenerbahçe 1989–90
Brian Steen Nielsen – Fenerbahçe 1993–95
Lars Olsen – Trabzonspor 1991–92
Frank Pingel – Bursaspor, Fenerbahçe 1993–95
Mikkel Rask – Diyarbakırspor 2009–10
Morten Rasmussen – Sivasspor 2011–12
Martin Spelmann – Gençlerbirliği 2015–16

Ecuador
 Rorys Aragón Espinoza – Diyarbakırspor 2009–10
Arturo Mina – Yeni Malatyaspor 2017–
Stiven Plaza – Trabzonspor 2020–21
Enner Valencia – Fenerbahçe 2020–

Egypt
 Ayman Abdel-Aziz – Kocaelispor, Malatyaspor, Gençlerbirliği, Trabzonspor, Konyaspor, Diyarbakırspor 2000–04, 2005–06, 2007–10
 Hossam Abdelmoneim – Kocaelispor 1999–2000
 Abdel El Saka – Denizlispor , Gençlerbirliği, Konyaspor, Gençlerbirliği, Eskişehirspor 1999–2008, 2009–10
 Besheer El-Tabei – Çaykur Rizespor 2005–07
Mohamed Elneny – Beşiktaş 2019–20
Karim Hafez – Kasımpaşa, Yeni Malatyaspor 2018–
 Ahmed Hassan – Kocaelispor, Denizlispor, Gençlerbirliği, Beşiktaş 1998–2005
 Samir Kamouna – Bursaspor 1999–2001
Kouka – Konyaspor 2021–
Kahraba – Hatayspor 2021–
 Sayed Moawad – Trabzonspor 2007–08
Mostafa Mohamed – Galatasaray 2020–
 Effat Nssar – Siirtspor 2000–01
 Ramadan Ragap – Ankaragücü, İstanbulspor A.Ş. 2003-05
Ahmed Yasser Rayyan – Altay 2021–
 Ibrahim Said – Çaykur Rizespor, Ankaragücü 2006–08
 Mohamed Shawky – Kayserispor 2009–10
Trezeguet – Kasımpaşa, İstanbul Başakşehir 2017–19, 2021–
 Amr Zaki – Elazığspor 2012–13

England
Dalian Atkinson – Fenerbahçe 1995–96
Lewis Baker – Trabzonspor 2020–21
Kevin Campbell – Trabzonspor 1998–99
Scott Carson – Bursaspor 2011–13
Danny Drinkwater – Kasımpaşa 2020–21
Anton Ferdinand – Bursaspor, Antalyaspor 2012–14
Les Ferdinand – Beşiktaş 1988–89
Ian Henderson – MKE Ankaragücü 2009–10
Cameron Jerome – Göztepe 2018–20
Jake Jervis – Elazığspor 2012–13
Aaron Lennon – Kayserispor 2020–21
Mike Marsh – Galatasaray 1995
 Rob McDonald – Beşiktaş 1989
Luke Moore – Elazığspor 2013–14
 Richard Offiong – İstanbulspor 2004
 Bright Osayi-Samuel – Fenerbahçe 2020–
Darius Vassell – MKE Ankaragücü 2009–10
Barry Venison – Galatasaray 1995
Daniel Sturridge – Trabzonspor 2019–20
Alan Walsh – Beşiktaş 1989–91

Equatorial Guinea
 Thierry Fidjeu Tazemeta – Diyarbakırspor, Konyaspor 2009–11

Estonia
 Pavel Londak – Bucaspor 2010–11

Ethiopia
 Walid Atta – Gençlerbirliği 2015–16

Finland
 İsmail Atik – Beşiktaş 1978–79
 Petteri Forsell – Bursaspor 2012–13
 Janne Hietanen – Denizlispor 2002–04
 Tommy Lindholm – Beşiktaş 1971–72
 Miikka Multaharju – Denizlispor 2004–05
 Jussi Nuorela – Elazığspor 2003–04
Joel Pohjanpalo – Çaykur Rizespor 2021–
 Antti Sumiala – Yozgatspor, Akçaabat Sebatspor 2001–02, 2003–04

France
Rayane Aabid – Hatayspor, Yeni Malatyaspor, Kasımpaşa 2020–
 Kodjo Afanou – Gaziantepspor 2007–09
 Nicolas Anelka – Fenerbahçe 2005–06
 Ibrahim Ba – Çaykur Rizespor 2006–07
 Claude Bakadal – Diyarbakırspor, Akçaabat Sebatspor 2003–05
 Stéphane Borbiconi – Manisaspor 2006–09
Mehdi Boudjemaa – Hatayspor 2021–
 Lionel Carole – Galatasaray 2015–17
 Cédric Carrasso – Galatasaray 2017–18
 Teddy Chevalier – Çaykur Rizespor 2013–16
Mounir Chouiar – Yeni Malatyaspor 2021–
 Mohammed Lamine Cisse – Konyaspor 2007–08
 Édouard Cissé – Beşiktaş 2007
Aly Cissokho – Yeni Malatyaspor, Antalyaspor 2017–19
Gaël Clichy – İstanbul Başakşehir 2017–
 Charles-Édouard Coridon – MKE Ankaragücü 2005–06
Enzo Crivelli – İstanbul Başakşehir 2019–
Wilfried Dalmat – Orduspor 2011–12
Oumar Dieng – Çaykur Rizespor, Trabzonspor, Konyaspor 2000–04
Jirès Kembo Ekoko – Bursaspor 2017–
Julien Escudé – Beşiktaş 2012–14
Valentin Eysseric – Kasımpaşa 2021–
Julien Faubert – Elazığspor 2012–13
Jean-Michel Ferri – İstanbulspor 1998
Sébastien Frey – Bursaspor 2013–14
Bafétimbi Gomis – Galatasaray 2017–18, 2021–
Prince-Désir Gouano – Gaziantepspor 2016
Yoan Gouffran – Göztepe 2017–19
Thomas Heurtaux – Ankaragücü 2018–19
Selim Ilgaz – Hatayspor 2020–
Nicolas Isimat-Mirin – Beşiktaş 2018–19
Yannick Kamanan – Sivasspor, Mersin İdmanyurdu 2009–12
Aboubakar Kamara - Yeni Malatyaspor 2018–19
Wilfried Kanga – Kayserispor 2020–21
Yann Karamoh – Fatih Karagümrük 2021–
Olivier Kemen – Kayserispor 2021–
Florent Malouda – Trabzonspor 2013–14
Jérémy Ménez – Antalyaspor 2017–18
Thibault Moulin – Ankaragücü 2018–19
Rashad Muhammed – BB Erzurumspor 2018–21
Samir Nasri – Antalyaspor 2017–18
Axel Ngando – Göztepe 2017–
Michaël Niçoise – Gençlerbirliği 2005–07
Pascal Nouma – Beşiktaş 2000–01, 2002–03
Steven Nzonzi – Galatasaray 2019–20
Gabriel Obertan – BB Erzurumspor – 2018–
Kamal Ouejdide – Göztepe 2002–03
Jérémy Perbet – İstanbul Başakşehir 2014–15
Sébastien Pérez – Galatasaray 2001–02
Michaël Pereira – Yeni Malatyaspor 2017–
Mathieu Peybernes – Göztepe 2017–18
Pierre-Yves Polomat – Gençlerbirliği 2019–
Benoît Poulain – Kayserispor 2019–
 Grégory Proment – Antalyaspor 2010
 Sébastien Puygrenier – Karabükspor 2013
Adil Rami – Fenerbahçe 2019–20
Loïc Rémy – Çaykur Rizespor 2020–
Franck Ribéry – Galatasaray 2004–05
Rémy Riou – Alanyaspor 2017–18
Valentin Rosier – Beşiktaş 2020–
 Jérôme Rothen – MKE Ankaragücü 2010
 Cédric Sabin – Konyaspor 2007–08
Yannis Salibur – Fatih Karagümrük 2020–
Léo Schwechlen – Göztepe 2017–
 Didier Six (Dündar Siz) – Galatasaray 1987–88
Benjamin Stambouli – Adana Demirspor 2021–
 Ludovic Sylvestre – Çaykur Rizespor 2013–16
 Jonathan Téhoué – Kasımpaşa, Konyaspor 2007–09
Abdoulaye Touré – Fatih Karagümrük 2021–
William Vainqueur – Antalyaspor 2017–18
Mathieu Valbuena – Fenerbahçe 2017–19
Olivier Veigneau – Kasımpaşa 2015–
Rémi Walter – Yeni Malatyaspor 2019–

Gabon
Aaron Appindangoyé – Sivasspor 2019–
Aaron Boupendza – Hatayspor 2020–21
Malick Evouna – Konyaspor 2017–18
Mario Lemina – Galatasaray 2019–20
 Bruno Zita Mbanangoyé – Sivasspor 2009–10
 Roguy Méyé – Ankaraspor, MKE Ankaragücü 2008–11
 Axel Méyé – Eskişehirspor 2015–16
Didier Ndong – Yeni Malatyaspor 2021–
André Biyogo Poko – Karabükspor, Göztepe 2016–

Gambia 
Modou Barrow – Denizlispor 2019–20
Omar Colley – Beşiktaş 2022–
Pa Dibba – Adana Demirspor 2021–22
Bubacarr Sanneh – Göztepe 2019–20

Georgia
Aleksandr Amisulashvili – Kayserispor 2010–11
Archil Arveladze – Trabzonspor 1993–97
 Shota Arveladze – Trabzonspor 1993–97
Vato Arveladze – Fatih Karagümrük 2020–
 Besik Beradze – Trabzonspor 1994
Giorgi Chelidze – Samsunspor 2009–10
Lasha Dvali – Kasımpaşa 2015
Nika Dzalamidze – Çaykur Rizespor 2015–16
Grigol Imedadze – Kocaelispor 2003
Gocha Jamarauli – Trabzonspor 1997–98
 Kakhaber Kacharava – Trabzonspor 1994
Revaz Kemoklidze – Kocaelispor 2003
Zurab Khizanishvili – Kayserispor 2011–14
Akaki Khubutia – Samsunspor 2011–12
Giorgi Kiknadze – Samsunspor 1999–2000
Saba Lobzhanidze – MKE Ankaragücü 2019–
 Giorgi Nemsadze – Trabzonspor 1996–97
 Tornike Okriashvili – Eskişehirspor 2016
Levan Shengelia – Konyaspor 2019–

Germany
Rüdiger Abramczik – Galatasaray 1984–85
Atakan Akkaynak – Çaykur Rizespor 2019–20
Raimond Aumann – Beşiktaş 1994–95
Marvin Bakalorz – Denizlispor 2020–21
Makana Baku – Göztepe 2021–
Andreas Beck – Beşiktaş 2015–17
Mërgim Berisha – Fenerbahçe 2021–
Thomas Berthold – Adanaspor 2000–01
Alexander Blessin – Antalyaspor 2001–02
Can Bozdogan – Beşiktaş 2021–
Onur Bulut – Alanyaspor, Çaykur Rizespor 2019–
Erdem Canpolat – Kasımpaşa 2020–
Şahverdi Çetin – MKE Ankaragücü 2020–
Yusuf Çoban – Antalyaspor 2017–18
Mustafa Doğan – Fenerbahçe, Beşiktaş 1996–2003, 2004–07
Robert Enke – Fenerbahçe 2003–04
Fabian Ernst – Beşiktaş, Kasımpaşa 2008–13
Pierre Esser – Galatasaray 1997
Malik Fathi – Kayserispor 2012–13
Michael Fink – Beşiktaş, Samsunspor 2009–12
Maurizio Gaudino – Antalyaspor 1999–2002
Mario Gómez – Beşiktaş 2015–2016
Falko Götz – Galatasaray 1992–94
Jürgen Groh – Trabzonspor 1985
Torsten Gütschow – Galatasaray 1993
Stephan Hanke – Siirtspor 2000–01
Dirk Hebel – Bursaspor 1997
Dirk Heinen – Denizlispor 2002–03
Thomas Hengen – Beşiktaş 1999
Roberto Hilbert – Beşiktaş 2010–13
Daniel Hoffmann – Kocaelispor 2000
Loris Karius – Beşiktaş 2018–20
Erdal Kılıçaslan – Gençlerbirliği, Konyaspor, Mersin İdmanyurdu, Osmanlıspor 2006–12, 2013–14, 2015–17
Süleyman Koç – Çaykur Rizespor 2017–
Michael Kraft – Bakırköyspor 1990–93
Max Kruse – Fenerbahçe 2019–
Stefan Kuntz – Beşiktaş 1995–96
Alexander Löbe – Erzurumspor, Trabzonspor, Malatyaspor 1999–2002
Marko Marin – Trabzonspor 2015–16
Levent Mercan – Fatih Karagümrük 2021–
Max Meyer – Fenerbahçe 2021–
Detlef Müller (Metin Mert) – Sarıyer, Trabzonspor, Kocaelispor, Konyaspor, Antalyaspor 1990–2003
Markus Münch – Beşiktaş 1999–2001
Deniz Naki – Gençlerbirliği 2013–14
Markus Neumayr – Kasımpaşa 2017–18
Tobias Nickenig – Orduspor 2011–12
Barış Özbek – Galatasaray, Trabzonspor, Kayserispor  2007–12, 2015–16
Mesut Özil – Fenerbahçe 2020–
Jürgen Pahl – Çaykur Rizespor 1987–89
Lukas Podolski – Galatasaray 2015–17
Alessandro Riedle – Akhisar Belediyespor 2013–14
Sidney Sam – Antalyaspor 2020–
Oliver Schäfer – Beşiktaş 1999–2000
Sven Scheuer – Adanaspor 2000–01
Toni Schumacher – Fenerbahçe 1988–91
Dirk Schuster – Antalyaspor 1999–2000
Martin Spanring – Bursaspor 2000
Reinhard Stumpf – Galatasaray 1992–94
Serdar Tasci – İstanbul Başakşehir 2018–19
Selim Teber – Denizlispor, Kayserispor, Samsunspor, Karabükspor 2005–06, 2010–13
Lennart Thy – Erzurumspor 2018–19
Sixten Veit – Beşiktaş 2001
Andreas Wagenhaus – Fenerbahçe 1993–94
Dominik Werling – Sakaryaspor 2007
Robin Yalçın – Çaykur Rizespor, Yeni Malatyaspor 2015–
Ersin Zehir – Antalyaspor 2021–
Marc Ziegler – Bursaspor 2000

Ghana
Yaw Ackah – Kayserispor 2020–
Afriyie Acquah – Yeni Malatyaspor 2019–21
Daniel Addo – Gençlerbirliği, Hacettepe 2008–10
Enoch Kofi Adu – Akhisar Belediyespor 2017–18
Joseph Akomadi – Hatayspor 2020–21
Kofi Amoako Atta – Bursaspor 2017–18
Joseph Larweh Attamah – İstanbul Başakşehir, Çaykur Rizespor 2016–20
Emmanuel Agyemang-Badu – Bursaspor 2017–18
Augustine Ahinful – MKE Ankaragücü, Trabzonspor 2000–08
Jerry Akaminko – Manisaspor, Eskişehirspor 2011–16
Joseph Amoah – MKE Ankaragücü, Göztepe 2001–03
Matthew Amoah – Mersin İdmanyurdu 2011–12
Stephen Appiah – Fenerbahçe 2005–07
Philip Awuku – Yeni Malatyaspor 2021–
André Ayew – Fenerbahçe 2018–19
Kwame Ayew – Yozgatspor, Kocaelispor 2000–02
Stephen Baidoo – MKE Ankaragücü, Samsunspor 1996–2005
 Ahmed Barusso – Galatasaray 2007–08
 James Boadu – Gençlerbirliği, Hacettepe 2007–09
Kevin-Prince Boateng – Beşiktaş 2019–20
 John Boye – Kayseri Erciyesspor, Sivasspor 2014–16
Raman Chibsah – Gaziantep 2019–20
Isaac Cofie – Sivasspor 2019–
Kofi Deblah – Diyarbakırspor 2002
Godfred Donsah – Çaykur Rizespor, Yeni Malatyaspor 2020–
 Emmanuel Duah – Adana Demirspor, Eskişehirspor 1994–96
Caleb Ekuban – Trabzonspor 2018–21
Mohammed Fatau – Gaziantepspor 2016–17
Asamoah Gyan – Kayserispor 2017–19
Samuel Inkoom – Antalyaspor 2016–17
Kamal Issah – Gençlerbirliği, Eskişehirspor 2016–19
 Samuel Johnson – Fenerbahçe, Kayserispor 1999–2006
 Ohene Kennedy – MKE Ankaragücü 1997–2002
 Richard Kingson (Faruk Gürsoy) – Sakaryaspor, Göztepe, Antalyaspor, Elazığspor, Galatasaray, Ankaraspor 1998–2000, 2002–03, 2004–05, 2006–07
Gilbert Koomson – Kasımpaşa 2020–
Lumor – Göztepe 2018–19
Elvis Manu – Gençlerbirliği, Akhisar Belediyespor 2017–19
Bernard Mensah – Kasımpaşa, Kayserispor, Beşiktaş 2017–
 Habib Mohamed – MKE Ankaragücü 2007
 Adamu Mohammed – Gençlerbirliği, Hacettepe 2008–09
Sulley Muniru – Yeni Malatyaspor 2018–19
Yevhen Opanasenko – Konyaspor 2018–19
 Daniel Opare – Beşiktaş 2015
Michael Osei – Vanspor 1997
Haqi Osman – Yeni Malatyaspor 2021–
Joseph Paintsil – MKE Ankaragücü 2020–21
Yaw Preko – Gaziantepspor, Fenerbahçe, Yozgatspor 1997–2004
Isaac Sackey – Alanyaspor 2016–19
 Abdul Rahim Sebah – Kasımpaşa 2010–11
Nuru Sulley – Alanyaspor 2016–17
 Prince Tagoe – Bursaspor 2011
Abdul Aziz Tetteh – Gaziantep 2019–
Benjamin Tetteh – Yeni Malatyaspor 2020–
Emmanuel Tetteh – Vanspor, Trabzonspor, Bursaspor, Çaykur Rizespor 1999–2003
 Patrick Twumasi – Gaziantep 2019–20
 Abdul Majeed Waris – Trabzonspor 2014–15
 Shaibu Yakubu – Hacettepe 2008–09

Greece
Anastasios Bakasetas – Alanyaspor 2019–
Dimitris Chatziisaias – Çaykur Rizespor 2019–
Theofanis Gekas – Akhisar Belediyespor, Konyaspor, Eskişehirspor 2013–16
Dimitris Goutas  – Sivasspor 2021–
Alexandros Katranis – Hatayspor 2020–
Stelios Kitsiou – MKE Ankaragücü 2019–
Dimitrios Kolovetsios – Kayserispor 2020–
Giannis Maniatis – Alanyaspor – 2017–19
Kostas Mitroglou – Galatasaray 2018–19
Avraam Papadopoulos – Trabzonspor 2014–15
Dimitris Pelkas – Fenerbahçe 2020–
Emmanouil Siopis – Alanyaspor 2019–
Georgios Tzavellas – Alanyaspor 2017–
Alexandros Tziolis – Kayserispor 2014

Guinea
 Ibrahima Bangoura – Denizlispor, Konyaspor 2009–11
 Demba Camara – Gaziantepspor 2014–16
 Mohamed Cissé – Bursaspor 2007–08
 Kévin Constant – Trabzonspor 2014–15
 Mamadou Alimou Diallo – Sivasspor, Diyarbakırspor, Sivasspor 2007–10
Sadio Diallo – Yeni Malatyaspor, Gençlerbirliği 2017–18, 2019–
 Saliou Diallo – Yozgatspor 2000–01
 Kaba Diawara – Gaziantepspor 2006–08
Simon Falette – Fenerbahçe – 2019–20
 Pascal Feindouno – Elazığspor 2012
 Daouda Jabi – Kayseri Erciyesspor, Trabzonspor 2005–08
Julian Jeanvier – Kasımpaşa – 2020–21
 Torric Jebrin – Bucaspor 2011
 Oumar Kalabane – Manisaspor 2007–11
Bengali-Fodé Koita – Kasımpaşa 2016–
Guy-Michel Landel – Gençlerbirliği, Alanyaspor 2015–18
 Ousmane N'Gom Camara – Konyaspor 2004–05
 Souleymane Oularé – Fenerbahçe 1999–2000
Florentin Pogba – Gençlerbirliği 2017–18
 Kanfory Sylla – Sivasspor, İstanbul Büyükşehir Belediyespor, Konyaspor 2007–10
 Ibrahim Yattara – Trabzonspor, Mersin İdmanyurdu 2002–12
 Souleymane Youla – Gençlerbirliği, Beşiktaş, Eskişehirspor, Denizlispor, Orduspor 2003–06, 2008–11
 Kamil Zayatte – Konyaspor, İstanbul Büyükşehir Belediyespor 2011–13

Guinea-Bissau
Edgar Ié – Trabzonspor 2020–22
Leocísio Sami – Akhisar Belediyespor 2015–17

Haiti 
 Wilde-Donald Guerrier – Alanyaspor 2016–17

Honduras
 Maynor Suazo – Antalyaspor 2006–09
 Carlo Costly – Gaziantepspor 2014

Hungary
 Balázs Dzsudzsák – Bursaspor 2015–16
 Márkó Futács – Mersin İdmanyurdu 2014–16
 Péter Kabát – Göztepe, Denizlispor 2001–04
 Attila Kerekes – Bursaspor 1985–87
Vladimir Koman – Adanaspor 2016–17
 László Kuti – Denizlispor 1985–86
 Joe Erwin Kuzman – Beşiktaş, Boluspor 1966–67, 1968–70
 Pál Lázár – Samsunspor 2011–12
 Balázs Megyeri – Göztepe 2020–21
 Kenny Otigba – Kasımpaşa 2016–17
 Zsolt Petry – Gençlerbirliği 1995–96
 Attila Szalai – Fenerbahçe 2020–
 Tibor Szalay – Beşiktaş 1966–67
 Mihály Tulipán – Bursaspor 1985–86
 József Varga – Denizlispor 1985–87
 Kevin Varga – Kasımpaşa 2020–

Iceland
Birkir Bjarnason – Adana Demirspor 2021–
Atli Eðvaldsson – Gençlerbirliği 1989–90
Viðar Örn Kjartansson – Yeni Malatyaspor 2019–20
Eyjólfur Sverrisson – Beşiktaş 1994–95
Grétar Steinsson – Kayserispor 2012
Gunnar Heidar Thorvaldsson – Konyaspor 2013–14
Ólafur Ingi Skúlason – Gençlerbirliği, Karabükspor 2016–18
Kolbeinn Sigþórsson – Galatasaray 2016–17

Ireland
 Billy Mehmet – Gençlerbirliği, Samsunspor 2010–11

Iran
Vahid Amiri – Trabzonspor 2018–19
Sohrab Bakhtiarizadeh – Erzurumspor 2000–01
Majid Hosseini – Trabzonspor 2018–
Hamed Kavianpour – Kayserispor 2006
Mohammad Khakpour – Vanspor 1997
Mohammad Momeni – Erzurumspor 2000–01
Mohammad Naderi – Altay 2021–
Naser Sadeghi (Nasır Vanlıoğlu) – Galatasaray, Konyaspor 1987–88
Payam Sadeghian – Osmanlıspor 2017–18
Allahyar Sayyadmanesh – Fenerbahçe 2019–20
Sajjad Shahbazzadeh – Alanyaspor 2016–17
Reza Shahroudi – Altay 1998–99

Iraq
Bassim Abbas – Diyarbakırspor, Konyaspor 2009–11
Ali Adnan – Çaykur Rizespor 2013–15
Dhurgham Ismail – Çaykur Rizespor 2015–17
Ali Faez – Çaykur Rizespor 2016–17
Osama Rashid – Gaziantep – 2020–21
Ahmed Yasin – Denizlispor 2020–21

Israel
 Ronen Harazi – Bursaspor 1998–99
 Haim Revivo – Fenerbahçe, Galatasaray 2000–03
 Pini Balili – İstanbulspor, Kayserispor, Sivasspor, Antalyaspor 2003–10
 Ofir Haim – İstanbulspor 2004
 Salim Tuama – Kayserispor 2004

Italy
Mario Balotelli – Adana Demirspor 2021–23
Rayyan Baniya – Fatih Karagümrük 2021–
Andrea Bertolacci – Fatih Karagümrük, Kayserispor 2020–
Davide Biraschi – Fatih Karagümrük 2021–
Fabio Borini – Fatih Karagümrük 2020–
Alessio Cerci – MKE Ankaragücü 2018–19
Morgan De Sanctis – Galatasaray 2008–09
Matteo Ferrari – Beşiktaş 2009–11
Federico Giunti – Beşiktaş 2003–04
Stefano Napoleoni – İstanbul Başakşehir, Göztepe 2016–21
Stefano Okaka – İstanbul Başakşehir 2021–
Davide Petrucci – Çaykur Rizespor 2016–19
Andrea Poli – Antalyaspor 2021–22
Simone Scuffet – Kasımpaşa 2018–19
Emiliano Viviano – Fatih Karagümrük 2020–
Nicolò Zaniolo – Galatasaray 2022–

Jamaica
Luton Shelton – Karabükspor 2011–13
Dever Orgill – MKE Ankaragücü, Antalyaspor 2019–21

Japan
 Junichi Inamoto – Galatasaray 2006–07
 Hajime Hosogai – Bursaspor 2015–16
 Shinji Kagawa – Beşiktaş 2019
 Yuto Nagatomo – Galatasaray 2018–20
 Takayuki Seto – Osmanlıspor 2015–16

Kazakhstan
Alexander Merkel – Gaziantep – 2021–
Evgeny Yarovenko – Sarıyer 1992–94

Kenya
Johanna Omolo – BB Erzurumspor 2020–

Kosovo
Arsim Abazi – Malatyaspor 2001–03
Kemal Ademi – Fenerbahçe, Fatih Karagümrük 2020–21
Donis Avdijaj – Trabzonspor 2019–20
Zymer Bytyqi – Konyaspor 2020–23
Agim Cana – Gençlerbirliği, Samsunspor 1987–89
Fahrudin Durak – Galatasaray, Bursaspor 1992–93, 1995–97
Florent Hadergjonaj – Kasımpaşa 2018–
Florian Loshaj – İstanbulspor 2022–
Alban Meha – Konyaspor 2015–17
Arijanet Muric – Adana Demirspor 2021–22
Vedat Muriqi – Gençlerbirliği, Çaykur Rizespor, Fenerbahçe 2016–20
Atdhe Nuhiu – Eskişehirspor 2012–13
Xhevad Prekazi – Galatasaray, Altay, Bakırköyspor 1985–93
Elbasan Rashani – BB Erzurumspor 2020–21
Loret Sadiku – Mersin İdmanyurdu, Kasımpaşa 2014–22
Herolind Shala – Kasımpaşa 2016–17
Skënder Shengyli – Karşıyaka 1989–91
Jetmir Topalli – Yeni Malatyaspor, İstanbulspor 2020–21, 2022–
Veton Tusha – Denizlispor 2020–21
Samir Ujkani – Çaykur Rizespor 2018–19
Idriz Voca – MKE Ankaragücü 2020–21
Fadil Vokrri – Fenerbahçe 1990–92

Latvia
 Deniss Ivanovs – Sivasspor 2010–11

Lebanon
 Bilal Aziz Özer – Kayserispor 2008–09
 Joan Oumari – Sivasspor 2016–17

Liechtenstein
 Cengiz Biçer – Mersin İdmanyurdu 2011–13

Liberia
 Joseph Amoah – MKE Ankaragücü, Göztepe 2001–03
 James Debbah – MKE Ankaragücü 1998
 Jimmy Dixon – Manisaspor 2009–12
Mohammed Kamara – Hatayspor 2020–
Amadaiya Rennie – Antalyaspor 2016–17
Tonia Tisdell – MKE Ankaragücü, Mersin İdmanyurdu, Osmanlıspor 2011–12, 2015–
 Theo Weeks – Ankaraspor, MKE Ankaragücü 2008–11

Libya
 Tarik El Taib – Gaziantepspor 2004–06

Lithuania 
 Gintaras Staučė – Galatasaray, Karşıyaka, Sarıyer 1994–97
 Gediminas Paulauskas – MKE Ankaragücü 2008
Žydrūnas Karčemarskas – Gaziantepspor, Osmanlıspor 2010–
Arvydas Novikovas – BB Erzurumspor 2020–
 Darvydas Šernas – Gaziantepspor 2013
 Marius Stankevičius – Gaziantepspor 2013–14
 Ernestas Šetkus – Sivasspor 2015–16

Luxembourg 

 Gerson Rodrigues – MKE Ankaragücü 2019–

Malaysia
 Natxo Insa – Antalyaspor 2013–14

Mali
Mahamadou Ba – BB Erzurumspor 2020–21
Samba Camara – Sivasspor 2019–
Fernand Coulibaly – Adana Demirspor, Gaziantepspor, MKE Ankaragücü, Gaziantepspor, Denizlispor, Siirtspor, Diyarbakırspor 1994–99, 2000–03
Cheick Oumar Dabo – Gençlerbirliği 2001–02
Cheick Diabaté – Osmanlıspor 2016–18
Fousseni Diabaté – Sivasspor 2018–19
Abdoulay Diaby – Beşiktaş 2019–
Souleymane Diarra – Gaziantep 2019–
Nouha Dicko – Gaziantep 2020–
Mamadou Fofana – Alanyaspor 2017
 Souleymane Keita – Sivasspor 2010–12
Youssouf Koné – Hatayspor 2020–21
Aly Mallé – Yeni Malatyaspor 2020–
 Hadi Sacko – MKE Ankaragücü 2018–19
Mamadou Samassa – Sivasspor 2019–
Samba Sow – Karabükspor, Kayserispor 2013–17
Abdul Wahid Sissoko – Akhisar Belediyespor 2016–
Yacouba Sylla – Kayseri Erciyesspor 2014–15
Bakaye Traoré – Kayseri Erciyesspor, Bursaspor 2013–16
Adama Traoré – Hatayspor 2020–
Hamidou Traoré – Karabükspor 2017–18
Mustapha Yatabaré – Trabzonspor, Karabükspor, Konyaspor, Sivasspor 2014–15, 2016–

Martinique
Mickaël Malsa – Kasımpaşa 2022–

Mauritania
Souleymane Doukara – Osmanlıspor, Antalyaspor, Giresunspor 2017–19, 2021–
Diallo Guidileye – Gençlerbirliği 2017–18
El Mami Tetah – Alanyaspor 2021–

Mexico
 Sergio Almaguer – Galatasaray 2002
 Antonio de Nigris – Gaziantepspor, Ankaraspor, MKE Ankaragücü 2006–09
 Giovani dos Santos – Galatasaray 2010
Rogelio Funes Mori – Eskişehirspor 2014–15
Diego Reyes – Fenerbahçe 2018–19

Moldova
 Serghei Epureanu – Samsunspor, İstanbulspor 2000–01
Alexandru Epureanu – İstanbul Başakşehir 2014–

Montenegro
Radoslav Batak – Ankaraspor, Antalyaspor 2005–07, 2009–10
Radomir Đalović – Kayseri Erciyesspor 2006–07
Ardijan Djokaj – Trabzonspor, Ankaraspor 2005–07
Petar Grbić – Akhisar Belediyespor 2015–16
Ivan Kecojević – Gaziantepspor 2012–13
Miodrag Martać – Karşıyaka 1987–90
Vukan Perović – Adanaspor 1977–78
Vasilije Radović – Fenerbahçe 1966–67
Vladimir Rodić – Karabükspor 2016–17
Marko Simić – Kayserispor 2012–14, 2015–16
Zoran Simović – Galatasaray 1984–90
Aleksandar Šćekić – Gençlerbirliği 2016–18
Žarko Vukčević – Zonguldakspor 1985–87

Morocco
 Mohamed Abarhoun – Çaykur Rizespor 2018–20
 Nordin Amrabat – Kayserispor, Galatasaray 2011–14
 Ismaïl Aissati – Antalyaspor, Alanyaspor 2012–13, 2016–17
 Jamal Alioui – Karabükspor 2010
 Yacine Bammou – Alanyaspor 2019–20
Abdelaziz Barrada – Antalyaspor 2018–19
Younès Belhanda – Galatasaray 2017–21
Medhi Benatia – Fatih Karagümrük 2021–22
Zakarya Bergdich – Denizlispor, BB Erzurumspor 2019–21
 Nourdin Boukhari – Kasımpaşa 2009–10
 Mehdi Bourabia – Konyaspor 2017–18
Khalid Boutaïb – Yeni Malatyaspor 2017–19
Aatif Chahechouhe – Sivasspor, Fenerbahçe, Çaykur Rizespor, Antalyaspor, Fatih Karagümrük, BB Erzurumspor  2012–21
Issam Chebake – Yeni Malatyaspor 2017–21
Michaël Chrétien Basser – Bursaspor 2011–14
Manuel da Costa – Sivasspor, İstanbul Başakşehir F.K., Trabzonspor, BB Erzurumspor 2013–15, 2017–21
Nabil Dirar – Fenerbahçe, Kasımpaşa 2017–
Ayoub El Kaabi – Hatayspor 2021–23
Moestafa El Kabir – Gençlerbirliği, Çaykur Rizespor 2015–19
Ahmed El Messaoudi – Gaziantep – 2021–
Reda Ereyahi – Göztepe 2000
Fayçal Fajr – Sivasspor 2020–22
Zouhair Feddal – Alanyaspor 2022–
Youssouf Hadji – Elazığspor 2013
Hamza Mendyl – Gaziantep – 2021–22
Youness Mokhtar – MKE Ankaragücü 2018–19
Munir – Hatayspor 2020–22
Adrien Regattin – Osmanlıspor 2016–18
Marwane Saâdane – Çaykur Rizespor 2016–19
Rial Sellam – Bursaspor 1966–67
Jamal Sellami – Beşiktaş 1997–98
Khalid Sinouh – Kasımpaşa 2007–08
Oussama Tannane – Göztepe 2021–22
Mehdi Taouil – Sivasspor 2013–16
Adnane Tighadouini – Kayserispor 2015–16

Namibia
 Razundara Tjikuzu – Çaykur Rizespor, İstanbul Büyükşehir Belediyespor, Trabzonspor, Diyarbakırspor, Kasımpaşa 2006–11

Netherlands
Ryan Babel – Kasımpaşa, Beşiktaş, Galatasaray 2013–15, 2017–
Nacer Barazite – Yeni Malatyaspor 2017–18
Mike van Beijnen – Gençlerbirliği 2019–20
Jeffrey Bruma – Kasımpaşa 2021–
Brahim Darri – BB Erzurumspor 2020–21
Frank de Boer – Galatasaray 2003–04
Nigel de Jong – Galatasaray 2016–18
Brahim Darri – Fatih Karagümrük, BB Erzurumspor 2020–21
Stefano Denswil – Trabzonspor 2021–
Royston Drenthe – Kayseri Erciyesspor 2014–15
Eljero Elia – İstanbul Başakşehir 2017–20
Marvin Emnes – Akhisar Belediyespor 2017–18
Leroy Fer – Alanyaspor 2021–
Sherel Floranus – Antalyaspor 2021–
Dogan Gölpek – Konyaspor 2020–21
Ferhat Görgülü – Gençlerbirliği, Karabükspor 2013–18
Dogucan Haspolat – Kasımpaşa 2019–
Vincent Janssen – Fenerbahçe 2017–18
Joshua John – Bursaspor 2016–19
Ferdi Kadioglu – Fenerbahçe 2019–
 Leandro Kappel – Altay 2021–
 Dirk Kuyt – Fenerbahçe 2012–15
Jeremain Lens – Fenerbahçe, Beşiktaş, Fatih Karagümrük 2016–
Derrick Luckassen – Kasımpaşa 2020–21
Kevin Luckassen – Kayserispor 2020–
 Adam Maher – Osmanlıspor 2016–17
 Hilmi Mihçi – Sivasspor 2006–07
 Kiki Musampa – Trabzonspor 2006–07
Joey Pelupessy – Giresunspor 2021–
Glynor Plet – Alanyaspor 2017–19
Ben Rienstra – Kayserispor 2019–
 Lodewijk Roembiak – Antalyaspor 1994–96
Mustafa Saymak – Çaykur Rizespor 2018–19
Mats Seuntjens – Gençlerbirliği 2019–
 Wesley Sneijder – Galatasaray 2013–17
Patrick van Aanholt – Galatasaray 2021–
 John van den Brom – İstanbulspor 1995–96
 Gregory van der Wiel – Fenerbahçe 2016–17
 Ulrich van Gobbel – Galatasaray 1995–96
 Pierre van Hooijdonk – Fenerbahçe 2003–05
 Bart van Hintum – Gaziantepspor 2016–17
Robin van Persie – Fenerbahçe 2015–18
 Peter van Vossen – İstanbulspor 1995
 Boy Waterman – Karabükspor 2013–15
 Nordin Wooter – Sivasspor 2006–07
 Salih Yildiz 
 Marvin Zeegelaar – Elazığspor 2012–13, 2014
 Sergio Zijler – Orduspor 2011

New Zealand
Joe Champness – Giresunspor – 2021–
 Shane Smeltz – Gençlerbirliği 2010–11

Nigeria
Shehu Abdullahi – Bursaspor – 2017–19
 David Solomon Abwo – Gençlerbirliği 2006
 Victor Agali – Kayseri Erciyesspor, MKE Ankaragücü 2005–07
 Akeem Agbetu – Kocaelispor, Sivasspor 2008–10
 Julius Aghahowa – Kayserispor 2008–09
 Alloysius Agu – Kayserispor 1994–97
Mikel Agu – Bursaspor 2017–18
David Akintola – Hatayspor, Adana Demirspor 2020–
 Joseph Akpala – Karabükspor 2013–15
 Daniel Amokachi – Beşiktaş 1996–99
 Gbenga Arokoyo – Gaziantepspor 2014–16
Iyayi Atiemwen – Çaykur Rizespor 2016–17
 Chidozie Awaziem – Çaykur Rizespor 2018–19
 Tijani Babangida – Gençlerbirliği 2000–01
Francis Ezeh – Adana Demirspor 2021–
 Brown Ideye – Göztepe 2020–
John Chibuike – Gaziantepspor, Samsunspor 2014–16, 2017–18
 Macauley Chrisantus – Sivasspor 2014–15
Emem Eduok – Kasımpaşa, Erzurumspor 2016–19
 Ekigho Ehiosun – Samsunspor, Gençlerbirliği 2011–13
Elderson Echiéjilé – Sivasspor 2017–18
 Bright Edomwonyi – Çaykur Rizespor 2017–18
 Emmanuel Emenike – Karabükspor 2010–11, Fenerbahçe 2013–15, 2016–17
 Michael Eneramo – Sivasspor, Beşiktaş, Karabükspor, İstanbul Başakşehir 2011–16
Anderson Esiti – Gaziantep 2020–
Peter Etebo – Galatasaray 2020–21
Patrick Friday Eze – Konyaspor 2017–18
Imoh Ezekiel – Konyaspor 2017–18
 Edema Godmin Fuludu – Altay 1994–97
 Nosa Igiebor – Çaykur Rizespor 2017
 Dominic Iorfa – Galatasaray 1992–93
Leke James – Sivasspor 2021–
 Uche Kalu – Çaykur Rizespor 2013
Olarenwaju Kayode – Gaziantep 2019–
Lanre Kehinde – MKE Ankaragücü – 2018–
Raheem Lawal – Mersin İdmanyurdu, Eskişehirspor, Osmanlıspor 2013–
 Victor Moses – Fenerbahçe 2018–20
Paul Mukairu – Antalyaspor 2019–
Ahmed Musa – Fatih Karagümrük 2021–
Anthony Nwakaeme – Trabzonspor 2018–
 Obinna Nwobodo – Göztepe 2020–
Joel Obi – Alanyaspor 2018–19
Mikel John Obi – Trabzonspor 2019–
Godfrey Oboabona – Çaykur Rizespor 2013–17
Azubuike Okechukwu – Yeni Malatyaspor, Çaykur Rizespor, İstanbul Başakşehir 2017–
 Uche Okechukwu (Deniz Uygar) – Fenerbahçe, İstanbulspor 1993–2006
 Jay-Jay Okocha (Muhammet Yavuz) – Fenerbahçe 1996–98
 Oliver Ogbonnaya – Gençlerbirliği 2011–12
 Christopher Ohen – Beşiktaş 1998–99
 Kenneth Omeruo – Kasımpaşa, Alanyaspor 2015–17
Ogenyi Onazi – Trabzonspor, Denizlispor 2016–
Paschal Onyedika Okoli – Bursaspor 2017–
Henry Onyekuru – Galatasaray 2018–21
 Wilson Oruma – Samsunspor 1998–99
 Nduka Ozokwo – Mersin İdmanyurdu 2011–13
Valentine Ozornwafor – Galatasaray – 2020–
 Isaac Promise – Gençlerbirliği, Trabzonspor, Manisaspor, Antalyaspor, Balıkesirspor 2005–15
 Gideon Adinoy Sani – Akhisar Belediyespor 2012–13
Jesse Sekidika – Galatasaray 2019–
 Victor Shaka – Trabzonspor 1997
 Ike Shorunmu – Beşiktaş, Samsunspor 1999–2001, 2002–05
Seth Sincere – Yeni Malatyaspor 2017–
 Taye Taiwo – Bursaspor 2013–14
 William Troost-Ekong – Bursaspor – 2017–18
 Kalu Uche – Kasımpaşa 2012–13
Aminu Umar  – Osmanlıspor 2015–
 John Utaka – Sivasspor 2013–15
Anthony Uzodimma – Kayserispor 2019–20
 Yakubu – Kayserispor 2015–16
 Joseph Yobo – Fenerbahçe 2010–13
 Ayila Yussuf – Orduspor 2013
 Simon Zenke – Samsunspor, İstanbul Büyükşehir Belediyespor 2011–12, 2013

North Macedonia 
Jani Atanasov – Bursaspor 2018–
Daniel Avramovski – Kayserispor 2020–
Dančo Celeski – Kayserispor 1997–98
Erdon Daci – Konyaspor 2019–
Elif Elmas – Fenerbahçe 2017–19
Agim Ibraimi – Eskişehirspor 2010–11
Adis Jahović – Göztepe, Konyaspor 2017–
Čedomir Janevski – İstanbulspor 1995
Gjore Jovanovski – Samsunspor, MKE Ankaragücü 1986–89
Zoran Jovanovski – Samsunspor 2002–03
Berat Kalkan – Kasımpaşa 2020–
Dragan Kanatlarovski – Karşıyaka 1993–94
Stevica Kuzmanovski – Kocaelispor, Galatasaray, Antalyaspor, Eskişehirspor 1992–96
Goran Maznov – Diyarbakırspor 2005–06
Petar Miloševski – Trabzonspor, Malatyaspor, Akçaabat Sebatspor 1998–2005
Ilija Najdoski – Denizlispor 1994–95
Muarem Muarem – Eskişehirspor 2015–16
Mensur Nedžipi – Zeytinburnuspor 1990–91
Igor Nikolovski – Sakaryaspor, Trabzonspor 1998–2001
Arbën Nuhiji – Yozgatspor 2001–02
Goran Pandev – Galatasaray 2014–15
Artim Šakiri – Malatyaspor 2001–02
Goce Sedloski – Diyarbakırspor 2005–06
Žarko Serafimovski – Trabzonspor 2000–01
 Luka Stankovski – Gaziantep 2021–
Goran Stavrevski – Diyarbakırspor 2003–07
Veliče Šumulikoski – Bursaspor 2006–08
Leonard Zuta – Konyaspor 2018–20

Northern Ireland
 Kyle Lafferty – Çaykur Rizespor 2014–15

Norway
 Liban Abdi – Çaykur Rizespor 2014–15
 Torgeir Børven – MKE Ankaragücü 2020–
 John Carew – Beşiktaş 2004–05
Omar Elabdellaoui – Galatasaray 2020–
Morten Gamst Pedersen – Karabükspor 2013–14
Fredrik Gulbrandsen – Başakşehir 2019–
Vegar Eggen Hedenstad – Fatih Karagümrük 2020–22
Tobias Heintz – Kasımpaşa 2019–
 Etzaz Hussain – Sivasspor 2016
 Ronny Johnsen – Beşiktaş 1995–96
 Azar Karadas – Kasımpaşa 2009–12
 Rune Lange – Trabzonspor 2000
Martin Linnes – Galatasaray 2015–21
 Thomas Myhre – Beşiktaş 2001–02
Victor Nelsson – Galatasaray 2021–
 Kristian Opseth – Erzurumspor 2018–19
 Branimir Poljac – Konyaspor 2009–10
 Alexander Søderlund – Çaykur Rizespor 2020–
 Alexander Sørloth – Trabzonspor 2019–20
 Gøran Sørloth – Bursaspor 1993–94
 Arild Stavrum – Beşiktaş 2001–02
Jonas Svensson – Adana Demirspor 2021–
 Zlatko Tripić – Göztepe 2019–21
Anders Trondsen – Trabzonspor 2021–
Fredrik Ulvestad – Sivasspor 2021–

Pakistan
 Molla Bachs – Mersin İdmanyurdu 1967–68
 Abdul Cabbar – Mersin İdmanyurdu 1967–68
 Darius Sallam – Türk Telekom 1972–73

Paraguay
Emilio Aldama – Göztepe 1999–2000
Adam Bareiro – Alanyaspor 2020–21
Óscar Cardozo – Trabzonspor 2014–16
Robert Piris Da Motta – Gençlerbirliği 2020–21
Cristian Riveros – Kayserispor 2011–13
Jonathan Santana – Kayserispor 2010–12
Santiago Salcedo – MKE Ankaragücü 2003–04
Braian Samudio – Çaykur Rizespor 2018–21
Delio Toledo – Kayserispor 2006–10

Peru
 Luis Advíncula – Bursaspor 2015–16
 Ronald Pablo Baroni – Ankaragücü 1996–97
 Christian Cueva – Yeni Malatyaspor 2020–21
 Paolo Hurtado – Konyaspor 2018–21
 Francesco Manassero Zegarra – Beşiktaş 1993
 Andrés Mendoza – Diyarbakırspor 2009–10
 José del Solar – Beşiktaş 1998–99
 Santiago Salazar – Trabzonspor 2001–02
 Ysrael Zúñiga – Bursaspor 2008–09

Poland
Jarosław Araszkiewicz – Bakırköyspor 1990–92
Jarosław Bako – Beşiktaş 1991–93
Jarosław Bieniuk – Antalyaspor 2006–09
Paweł Brożek – Trabzonspor 2011–12
Piotr Brożek – Trabzonspor 2011–12
Jacek Cyzio – Trabzonspor, Karşıyaka 1992–95
Roman Dąbrowski (Kaan Dobra) – Kocaelispor, Beşiktaş, Antalyaspor 1994–2007
Piotr Dziewicki – Antalyaspor 2006–09
Dominik Furman – Gençlerbirliği 2020–
Arkadiusz Głowacki – Trabzonspor 2010–12
Adam Grad – Kayserispor 1994–95
Kamil Grosicki – Sivasspor 2011–13
Maciej Iwański – Manisaspor 2011
Jarosław Jach – Çaykur Rizespor 2018–19
Czessiaw Jakolcewicz – Fenerbahçe 1990–91
Damian Kadzior – Alanyaspor 2020–21
Janusz Kupcewicz – Adanaspor 1988–89
 Roman Kosecki – Galatasaray 1990–91
Marcin Kuś – İstanbul Büyükşehir Belediyespor 2008–12
Mateusz Lis – Altay 2021–
Daniel Łukasik – MKE Ankaragücü 2019–
Radosław Majdan – Göztepe, Bursaspor 2001–02, 2003–04
Patryk Małecki – Eskişehirspor 2012
Konrad Michalak – MKE Ankaragücü 2019–
Adrian Mierzejewski – Trabzonspor 2011–14
Radosław Murawski – Denizlispor 2019–
 Piotr Nowak – Bakırköyspor 1990–92
Ludovic Obraniak – Çaykur Rizespor 2015
Paweł Olkowski – Gaziantep 2019–
Mariusz Pawełek – Konyaspor, Çaykur Rizespor 2011, 2013
Bartłomiej Pawłowski – Gaziantep 2019–
Michał Pazdan – MKE Ankaragücü 2018–
Arkadiusz Piech – Sivasspor 2013
Tymoteusz Puchacz – Trabzonspor 2021–
Marcin Robak – Konyaspor, Mersin İdmanyurdu 2011–13
Artur Sobiech – Fatih Karagümrük 2020–
Piotr Soczynski – Fenerbahçe, Vanspor 1991–92, 1994–96
Adam Stachowiak – Denizlispor 2019–
 Mirosław Szymkowiak – Trabzonspor 2004–07
Łukasz Szukała – Osmanlıspor, MKE Ankaragücü 2015–
Jakub Szumski – BB Erzurumspor 2020–
Kamil Wilczek – Göztepe 2019–
Tomasz Zdebel – Gençlerbirliği 2000–03
Adam Zejer – Beşiktaş, Gaziantepspor 1991–93
Michał Żewłakow – MKE Ankaragücü 2010–11

Portugal
Hugo Almeida – Beşiktaş 2011–14
Bruno Alves – Fenerbahçe 2013–16
Zé António – Manisaspor 2008
Hélder Barbosa – Akhisar Belediyespor 2017–
Beto – Göztepe 2017–20
José Bosingwa – Trabzonspor 2013–15
Bruma – Galatasaray 2013–15
Daniel Candeias – Alanyaspor 2016–17
Miguel Cardoso – Kayserispor 2021–
André Castro – Kasımpaşa, Göztepe 2013–
Chiquinho – Giresunspor 2021–
Nuno Coelho – Balıkesirspor 2014
Miguel Crespo – Fenerbahçe 2021–
Custódio – Akhisar Belediyespor 2015–
Edinho – Kayseri Erciyesspor 2014–15
Eduardo – İstanbul Büyükşehir Belediyespor 2012–13
Gedson Fernandes – Galatasaray 2020–
Ivanildo Fernandes – Trabzonspor, Çaykur Rizespor 2019–
Jorge Fernandes – Kasımpaşa 2019–
Manuel Fernandes – Beşiktaş 2011–14
Miguel Garcia – Orduspor 2011–13
André Geraldes – İstanbul Büyükşehir Belediyespor 2012–13
Vítor Gomes – Balıkesirspor 2015
Zé Gomes – Konyaspor 2008–10
João Novais – Alanyaspor 2021–
João Pereira – Trabzonspor 2017–
Josué – Bursaspor, Galatasaray, Osmanlıspor 2014–
Miguel Lopes – Akhisar Belediyespor 2016–
Tiago Lopes – Kayserispor 2017–
Ariza Makukula – Kayserispor, Manisaspor, Karşıyaka 2009–13
Carlos Mané – Kayserispor 2021–
José Marafona – Alanyaspor 2019–
Fernando Meira – Galatasaray 2008–09
Raul Meireles – Fenerbahçe 2012–16
Manuel Mendoza – Boluspor 1970–71
Roderick Miranda – Gaziantep 2020–21
Nani – Fenerbahçe 2015–16
Neca – Konyaspor, Ankaraspor 2007–09
Luís Neto – Fenerbahçe 2017–18
Marco Paixão – Altay 2021–
Pelé – Eskişehirspor 2010–12
Pepe – Beşiktaş 2017–19
Tiago Pinto  – Osmanlıspor 2015–
Pizzi – İstanbul Başakşehir 2021–
Ricardo Quaresma – Beşiktaş, Kasımpaşa 2010–12, 2015–20
Pedro Rebocho – Beşiktaş 2019–
João Ribeiro – Orduspor 2011–12
Rúben Ribeiro – Hatayspor 2020–
André Santos – Balıkesirspor 2014–15
Henrique Sereno – Kayserispor 2013–14
Simão – Beşiktaş 2011–12
André Sousa – Gaziantep 2019–21
Diogo Sousa – Antalyaspor 2021–
Dimas Teixeira – Fenerbahçe 1999
Ricardo Vaz Tê – Akhisar Belediyespor 2015–17
Miguel Vieira – İstanbul Başakşehir 2019–20
Abel Xavier – Galatasaray 2003

Qatar
 Mohammed Salem Al-Enazi – Yimpaş Yozgatspor 2000

Republic of the Congo
Lucien Aubey – Sivasspor 2009–10
Thievy Bifouma – Sivasspor, Osmanlıspor, Ankaragücü, Yeni Malatyaspor 2016–20
Dzon Delarge – Osmanlıspor, Bursaspor 2016–18
Delvin N'Dinga – Sivasspor, Antalyaspor 2017–20
Dylan Saint-Louis – Hatayspor 2021–

Romania
 Denis Alibec – Kayserispor 2020–21
 Florin Andone – Galatasaray 2019–20
 Marius Alexe – Karabükspor 2017
 Liviu Antal – Gençlerbirliği 2014–15
 Ion Barbu – Beşiktaş 1970–71
 Cosmin Bodea – Sakaryaspor 1999
 Alexandru Bourceanu – Trabzonspor 2014
 Florin Bratu – Galatasaray 2003–04
 Stelian Carabaș – MKE Ankaragücü 2002–03
 Florin Cernat – Karabükspor, Çaykur Rizespor 2010–12, 2013–14
 Marius Cheregi – Samsunspor 1993–94
 Alexandru Cicâldău – Galatasaray 2021–2022
 Marius Coporan – Altay 1997
 Ionel Dănciulescu – Altay 1997
 Ilie Datcu – Fenerbahçe, Giresunspor 1969–76
 Nicolae Dică – Manisaspor 2010
 Silvian Dobre – Samsunspor 1993
 Iordan Eftimie – Zeytinburnuspor 1990–91
 Iulian Filipescu – Galatasaray 1996–99
 Cornel Frăsineanu – Bursaspor 2003–04, 2006–07
 Valerică Găman – Karabükspor 2016–18
 Ionel Ganea – Bursaspor 2003–04
 Valentin Gheorghe – Ümraniyespor 2022–
 Gheorghe Grozav – Karabükspor, Bursaspor 2017–18
 Gheorghe Hagi – Galatasaray 1996–2001
 Ovidiu Hanganu – Samsunspor 1993
 Ioan Hora – Konyaspor, Akhisar Belediyespor 2016–17
 Adrian Ilie – Galatasaray, Beşiktaş 1996–98, 2003–04
 Sabin Ilie – Fenerbahçe, Kocaelispor 1996–98
 Giani Kiriță – Samsunspor, Gaziantepspor, Ankaragücü, Bursaspor 2003–11
 Viorel Kraus – Altay 1969–70
 Iasmin Latovlevici – Gençlerbirliği, Karabükspor, Galatasaray, Bursaspor 2015–19
 Constantin Luca – Samsunspor 1993–94
 Silviu Lung Jr. – Kayserispor 2017–2022
 Ioan Lupescu – Bursaspor 2000
 Ionuț Luțu – Galatasaray 1998
 Marius Măldărășanu – Beşiktaş 2003
 Ciprian Marica – Konyaspor 2014–15
 Cosmin Matei – Gençlerbirliği 2016–17
 Alexandru Maxim – Gaziantep 2019–
 Iulian Miu – Bursaspor 2003–04
 Dănuț Moisescu – Altay 1997
 Viorel Moldovan – Fenerbahçe 1998–2000
 Olimpiu Moruțan – Galatasaray 2021–2022
 Ion Motroc – Altay 1969–70
 Radu Niculescu – Galatasaray, MKE Ankaragücü 2001–02
 Gheorghe Nițu – Bursaspor 1990–92
 Ion Nunweiller – Fenerbahçe 1968–70
 Lică Nunweiller – Beşiktaş 1969
 Vasile Oană – MKE Ankaragücü 1998
 Daniel Pancu – Beşiktaş, Bursaspor 2002–08
 Costel Pantilimon – Denizlispor 2020–21
 Paul Papp – Karabükspor, Sivasspor 2017–20
 Ovidiu Petre – Galatasaray 2003–05
 Gheorghe Popescu – Galatasaray 1997–01
 Octavian Popescu – Mersin İdmanyurdu 1969–71
 Florin Prunea – Erzurumspor 1998–99
 Valeriu Răchită – MKE Ankaragücü 1999
 Iosif Rotariu – Galatasaray, Bakırköyspor 1990–93
 Mircea Rednic – Bursaspor 1990–91
 Raul Rusescu – Osmanlıspor 2015–17
 Cristian Săpunaru – Kayserispor, Denizlispor,  Kayserispor 2017–21
 Mircea Sasu – Fenerbahçe 1970–71
 Bogdan Stancu – Galatasaray, Orduspor, Gençlerbirliği, Bursaspor, Gençlerbirliği 2010–21
 Dumitru Stângaciu – Vanspor, Kocaelispor 1995–2000
 Bogdan Stelea – Samsunspor 1994–95
 Leonard Strizu – Kayseri Erciyesspor, Sakaryaspor 1997–99
 Gabriel Tamaș – Galatasaray 2003–04 
 Cristian Tănase – Sivasspor, Karabükspor 2016–18
 Florin Tene – Karabükspor 1997–98
 Daniel Timofte – Samsunspor 1993–99
 Dan Topolinschi – Adana Demirspor, Bakırköyspor 1991–93
 Gabriel Torje – Konyaspor, Osmanlıspor, Karabükspor 2014–17
 Alin Toșca – Gaziantep  2019–
 Claudiu Vaișcovici – Bursaspor 1990–91
 Adrian Văsâi – Vanspor 1995–96
 Bogdan Vintilă – Bursaspor 2003–04

Russia 
 Vladimir Beschastnykh – Fenerbahçe 2003
 Vitali Dyakov – Sivasspor 2017–18
 Artem Dzyuba – Adana Demirspor 2022
 Vyacheslav Kamoltsev – Kocaelispor 2000
 Dmitri Khlestov – Beşiktaş 2000–02
 Arsen Khubulov – Erzurumspor 2018–19
 Fyodor Kudryashov – İstanbul Başakşehir FK, Antalyaspor 2019–2020, 2020–
 Yuri Lodygin – Gaziantep 2019–20
 Mukhsin Mukhamadiev – MKE Ankaragücü 1993–94
 Roman Neustädter – Fenerbahçe 2016–19
 Magomed Ozdoev — Fatih Karagümrük 2022–
 Zaur Sadayev – Ankaragücü 2018–20
 Oleg Salenko – İstanbulspor 1996–97
 Magomed-Shapi Suleymanov – Giresunspor 2021–2022

Rwanda
 Désiré Mbonabucya – Gaziantepspor 1997–2000

São Tomé and Príncipe
 Luís Leal – Gaziantepspor 2015

Scotland
 Kris Boyd – Eskişehirspor 2011–12
 Barry Douglas – Konyaspor 2016–17
 Steve Mallan – Yeni Malatyaspor 2020–
 Kenny Miller – Bursaspor 2010–11
 Allan McGregor – Beşiktaş 2012–13
 Maurice Ross – Kocaelispor 2009
 Michael Stewart – Gençlerbirliği 2010–11
 Ian Wilson – Beşiktaş 1989–90

Senegal
Abdoulaye Ba – Fenerbahçe, Alanyaspor 2015–17
Demba Ba – Beşiktaş, Göztepe SK, İstanbul Başakşehir FK  2014–15, 2016–21
Khouma Babacar – Alanyaspor 2020–22
 Aliou Badji – MKE Ankaragücü 2020–
 Stéphane Badji – İstanbul Başakşehir 2015–16
Ibrahima Baldé  – Giresunspor 2021–
Papiss Cissé – Alanyaspor, Fenerbahçe, Çaykur Rizespor 2018–
Famara Diédhiou – Alanyaspor 2021–
 Issiar Dia – Fenerbahçe 2010–12
 Fallou Diagne – Konyaspor 2018–
Mbaye Diagne – Kasımpaşa, Galatasaray 2017–20
 Pape Diakhaté – Kayseri Erciyesspor 2014, 2015
 Mamadou Diallo – Zeytinburnuspor 1996–97
 Lamine Diarra – Antalyaspor 2012–17
 Mamadou Diarra – Giresunspor 2021–
 Lamine Diatta – Beşiktaş 2007–08
Abdoulaye Diallo – Çaykur Rizespor 2016–17
 Cheikhou Dieng – İstanbul Başakşehir 2016–17
 Babacar Diop – Kayserispor 2012–14
 Mame Diouf – Hatayspor 2020–
Assane Dioussé – MKE Ankaragücü 2020–21
Papy Djilobodji – Gaziantep 2019–
Mamadou Fall – Kasımpaşa 2019–
 Jacques Faty – Sivasspor 2011–12
Ricardo Faty – Bursaspor, MKE Ankaragücü 2015–20
Lamine Gassama – Alanyaspor, Göztepe 2016–
 Ibrahima Gueye – Samsunspor 2005–06
Magaye Gueye – Adanaspor 2016–17
 Diomansy Kamara – Eskişehirspor 2011–14
Moussa Konaté  – Sivasspor 2021–
 Kader Mangane – Kayseri Erciyesspor 2013–14
 Victor Mendy – Bucaspor 2010–11
 Alfred N'Diaye – Bursaspor, Eskişehirspor 2011–12, 2013
Ousmane N'Diaye – Gençlerbirliği 2017–18
Dame N'Doye – Trabzonspor 2015–18
 Cherif Ndiaye – Göztepe 2020–
 Mamadou Niang – Fenerbahçe, Beşiktaş 2010–11, 2013
 Baye Oumar Niasse – Akhisar Belediyespor 2013–14
Alassane Ndao – Fatih Karagümrük, Antalyaspor 2020–
Papa Alioune Ndiaye  – Osmanlıspor, Galatasaray, Trabzonspor 2015–
 Joher Rassoul – Adana Demirspor 2021–
Henri Saivet – Sivasspor, Bursaspor 2017–19
Diafra Sakho – Bursaspor 2018–19
 Tidiane Sane – Elazığspor 2013–14
Younousse Sankharé – Giresunspor – 2021–
 Mohamed Sarr – Galatasaray 2002–03
 Ibrahima Sonko – Akhisar Belediyespor – 12–15
 Moussa Sow – Fenerbahçe 2012–15, 2016–17
 Pape Habib Sow – Elazığspor 2013–14
 Tony Sylva – Trabzonspor 2008–10
 Khaly Thiam – Gaziantepspor 2017
Mame Baba Thiam – Kasımpaşa, Fenerbahçe, Kayserispor 2019–
Zargo Touré – Trabzonspor, Gençlerbirliği 2018–

Serbia
Luka Adžić – MKE Ankaragücü 2020–21
 Duško Ajder – MKE Ankaragücü 1990–91 
Danijel Aleksić – Yeni Malatyaspor, İstanbul Başakşehir 2018–
 Dušan Anđelković – Kocaelispor 2008
 Darko Anić – Siirtspor 2001
 Radomir Antić – Fenerbahçe 1976–78
 Goran Bošković – Siirtspor 2000–01
 Aleksandar Bogdanović – Erzurumspor 2000–01
 Goran Čaušić – Eskişehirspor 2012–13, 2014–16
Armin Đerlek – Sivasspor 2019–20
 Ivan Ergić – Bursaspor 2009–11
 Naser Halitović – Boluspor 1985–90
 Saša Ilić – Galatasaray 2005–07
 Radmilo Ivančević – Fenerbahçe 1977–79
 Miodrag Ješić – Altay, Trabzonspor 1985–90, 1991–94
 Nenad Jestrović – Kocaelispor 2008–09
 Dragoslav Jevrić – Ankaraspor 2006–07
Marko Jevtović – Konyaspor 2018–
Milan Jevtović – Antalyaspor 2016–18
Miloš Jojić – İstanbul Başakşehir 2018–19
 Bojan Jorgačević – Kayseri Erciyesspor 2013–14
 Dušan Jovančić – Çaykur Rizespor 2020–
 Nikola Jozić – Gaziantepspor 2006
 Dragi Kaličanin – Bursaspor 1987–88
 Damir Kahriman – Konyaspor 2008
 Mateja Kežman – Fenerbahçe 2006–08
 Milorad Korać – Erzurumspor, Kocaelispor 2000–03
Miloš Kosanović – Göztepe 2017–
 Zlatko Krmpotić – Gençlerbirliği 1986–88
 Miloš Krasić – Fenerbahçe 2012–13
 Nikola Lazetić – Fenerbahçe 2000–02
Darko Lazić – Alanyaspor 2017–
 Dejan Lekić – Gençlerbirliği 2012–13
 Lazar Lemić – Fenerbahçe 1966–67
Adem Ljajić – Beşiktaş 2018–
 Živan Ljukovčan – Fenerbahçe 1986–88
Milan Lukač – Akhisar Belediyespor 2015–
 Lazar Marković – Fenerbahçe 2015–16
 Miloš Mihajlov – Konyaspor 2008–09
Srđan Mijailović – Kayserispor 2013–14, 2015–
 Đorđe Milić – Adanaspor, Beşiktaş 1971–75
Marko Milinković – Gençlerbirliği 2016–
Nemanja Milunović – Alanyaspor 2021–
 Miško Mirković (Mert Meriç) – Kocaelispor, Fenerbahçe, Elazığspor 1992–2003
 Zoran Mirković – Fenerbahçe 2000–03
 Milan Mitrović – Mersin İdmanyurdu 2013, 2014–16
 Danilo Nikolić – Karabükspor 2011–12
 Stevan Ostojić – Fenerbahçe 1971–73
 Sava Paunović – Beşiktaş 1977–78
Aleksandar Pešić – Fatih Karagümrük 2021–
Dušan Pešić – Fenerbahçe, Sakaryaspor 1984–89
Nikola Petković – Gençlerbirliği 2009
Radosav Petrović – Gençlerbirliği 2012–15
Zoran Savić – Siirtspor 2000–01
Marko Šćepović – Çaykur Rizespor 2019–
Petar Škuletić – Gençlerbirliği 2017–
Milan Smiljanić – Gençlerbirliği 2013–14
Uroš Spajić – Kasımpaşa 2021–
Miloš Stanojević – MKE Ankaragücü 2019–
Milan Stepanov – Trabzonspor, Bursaspor, Mersin İdmanyurdu 2006–08, 2010–13
Miladin Stevanović – Kayserispor 2017–
Miroslav Stević – Fenerbahçe 2002–03
Nikola Stojiljković – Kayserispor 2017–
Neven Subotić – Denizlispor 2020–21
Đorđe Tutorić – Kocaelispor 2008
Miroslav Tanjga – Fenerbahçe 1992
Nemanja Tomić – Gençlerbirliği 2013–16
Duško Tošić – Gençlerbirliği, Beşiktaş, Kasımpaşa 2012–18, 2020–21
Milijan Tupajić – Zonguldakspor, Rizespor 1985–88
Nemanja Vučićević – Manisaspor 2012
Jagoš Vuković – Konyaspor 2013–17
Rade Zalad – Eskişehirspor, Beşiktaş, MKE Ankaragücü 1986–93
Marko Zorić – Gençlerbirliği 2007–08

Sierra Leone
 Teteh Bangura – Bursaspor 2011–13
Steven Caulker – Alanyaspor, Gaziantep 2018–
 Khalifa Jabbie – Balıkesirspor 2014
Jocelyn Janneh – Kayserispor 2021–
 Musa Kallon – Vanspor 1994–95

Slovakia
Miroslav Barčík – Göztepe 2001–02
Matúš Bero – Trabzonspor 2016–18
Marek Čech – Trabzonspor 2011–13
Juraj Czinege  – Elazığspor 2002–04
Ondrej Debnár  – Elazığspor 2003–04
David Depetris – Çaykur Rizespor 2013
Ján Ďurica – Trabzonspor 2016–
Peter Grajciar – Konyaspor 2010–11
Marek Hamšík – Trabzonspor 2021–
Filip Hološko – Manisaspor, Beşiktaş, İstanbul Büyükşehir Belediyespor, Çaykur Rizespor 2006–15
Tomáš Hubočan – Trabzonspor 2017–
Miroslav Karhan – Beşiktaş 2000–01
Marián Kelemen – Bursaspor 2002–03
Miroslav König – Elazığspor 2003–04
Roman Kratochvíl – Denizlispor, Konyaspor 2002–09
Juraj Kucka – Trabzonspor – 2017–19
Ivan Lietava – Denizlispor, Konyaspor 2008–09, 2010–11
Róbert Mak – Konyaspor 2019–20
Ľubomír Meszároš – Elazığspor, Adanaspor 2002–04
Branislav Niňaj – Osmanlıspor 2017–
Vytykac Paval – Bursaspor 2002–03
Peter Pekarík – Kayserispor 2011–12
Erik Sabo – Fatih Karagümrük, Çaykur Rizespor 2020–
Marek Sapara – MKE Ankaragücü, Trabzonspor, Gaziantepspor, 2010–14
Stanislav Šesták – MKE Ankaragücü, Bursaspor 2010–14
Martin Škrtel – Fenerbahçe, İstanbul Başakşehir 2016–21
 Miloš Soboňa – Bursaspor 2002–03
 Pavol Straka – Antalyaspor 2006–07
 Tomáš Sedlák – Gaziantepspor 2007
 Štefan Senecký – Ankaraspor, MKE Ankaragücü, Sivasspor 2007–11, 2012–13
 Miroslav Stoch – Fenerbahçe, Bursaspor 2010–13, 2015–17
 Milan Timko – Kocaelispor, Adanaspor 2000–03
 Róbert Vittek – MKE Ankaragücü, Trabzonspor 2010–13
 Marián Zeman – İstanbulspor 1995–97

Slovenia
Jure Balkovec – Fatih Karagümrük 2020–
 Vid Belec – Konyaspor 2014–15
 Boško Boškovič – Antalyaspor 1994–95
 Damir Botonjič – Gençlerbirliği 1999–04
 Matjaž Cvikl – Zeytinburnuspor 1993–95
Matic Fink – Çaykur Rizespor 2016–17, 2018–19
Sašo Fornezzi – Orduspor, Antalyaspor 2011–14, 2015–17
 Dragan Jelić – Çaykur Rizespor 2006–07, 2008
Boban Jović – Bursaspor 2017–18
 Dejan Kelhar – Samsunspor 2012
 Dejan Lazarević – Antalyaspor, Karabükspor 2015–17
Miha Mevlja – Alanyaspor 2021–
 Džoni Novak – Fenerbahçe 1992–93
 Milan Osterc – Bursaspor 2003–04, Malatyaspor 2004–05
 Miran Pavlin – Samsunspor 2002
 Aleksander Rodić – Kayserispor 2005–06
 Ermin Rakovič – Diyarbakırspor 2006
Rajko Rotman – İstanbul Başakşehir, Kayserispor, Göztepe, Akhisarspor 2011–19
 Miral Samardžić – Akhisar Belediyespor 2017
 Marko Simeunovič – Şekerspor 1997–99
Nejc Skubic – Konyaspor 2016–
 Emil Šterbal – Siirtspor 2000–01
David Tijanić – Göztepe 2018–20, 2021–
 Etien Velikonja – Gençlerbirliği 2016–17
Amedej Vetrih – Çaykur Rizespor, Gaziantep 2019–
Miha Zajc – Fenerbahçe 2018–20, 2021–
 Luka Žinko – Kocaelispor 2008–09

South Africa
 Ryan Botha – Denizlispor 2004–07
 Elrio van Heerden – Sivasspor 2009–10
 Fani Madida – Beşiktaş, Antalyaspor, Bursaspor, Antalyaspor, Bursaspor 1992–98
 Donald Khuse – Gençlerbirliği, Antalyaspor 1993–97
 Steve Komphela – Gaziantepspor, Çanakkale Dardanelspor 1993–97
 May Mahlangu – Konyaspor 2014–15
Lebogang Manyama – Konyaspor 2017–18
 Helman Mkhalele – Kayserispor, MKE Ankaragücü, Göztepe, Malatyaspor 1997–2000, 2001–05
 Teboho Moloi – Gaziantepspor 1993–94
 Lebogang Morula – Vanspor 1997–98
 John Moshoeu – Gençlerbirliği, Kocaelispor, Fenerbahçe, Bursaspor 1993–2003
 Pollen Ndlanya – Bursaspor, Göztepe 1996–2000
 Dumisa Ngobe – Gençlerbirliği, MKE Ankaragücü, Akçaabat Sebatspor 1999–2001, 2003–04
 David Nyathi – MKE Ankaragücü 2000
 Alfred Phiri – Gençlerbirliği, Vanspor, Samsunspor 1996–2002
Lebogang Phiri – Çaykur Rizespor 2021–
Tokelo Rantie  – Gençlerbirliği 2016–18
 Godfrey Sapula – MKE Ankaragücü 1999–2000
 Calvin Sosibo – MKE Ankaragücü 2009–10
 Siphiwe Tshabalala – BB Erzurumspor 2018–19

South Korea
 Kim Do-yong – Karabükspor 1998
 Kim Min-jae – Fenerbahçe 2021–22
 Lee Eul-yong – Trabzonspor 2002–03, 2004–06
 Shin Young-rok – Bursaspor 2009
 Suk Hyun-jun – Trabzonspor 2016–17

Spain
Dani Abalo – Sivasspor 2015–16
Agus – Orduspor 2012–13
Alexis – Beşiktaş 2015–16
David Barral – Orduspor 2012–13
Isaac Cuenca – Bursaspor 2015–16
Dani – Denizlispor 2007
Jordi Figueras – Eskişehirspor 2016
Carlos García – Alanyaspor 2016–17
Daniel Güiza – Fenerbahçe 2008–11
Guti – Beşiktaş 2010–11
Jorge Félix – Sivasspor 2020–22
Josico – Fenerbahçe 2008–09
Juanfran (1976) – Beşiktaş 2004–05
Juanfran (1988) – Alanyaspor 2019–22
Álvaro Mejía – Konyaspor 2011–12
Javi Montero – Beşiktaş 2020–
Álvaro Negredo – Beşiktaş 2017–18
Iñaki Peña – Galatasaray 2021–22
Alejandro Pozuelo – Konyaspor 2022–
Fabricio Agosto Ramírez – Beşiktaş 2016–18
Albert Riera – Galatasaray 2011–13
José Rodríguez – Galatasaray 2015–16
Jaime Romero – Orduspor 2013
Víctor Ruiz – Beşiktaş 2019–20
Roberto Soldado – Fenerbahçe 2017–19
Fernando Varela – Kasımpaşa 2010–11
Vitolo – Elazığspor 2013

Suriname
 Roland Alberg – Elazığspor 2012–14
 Diego Biseswar – Kayserispor 2012–14, 2015–16
Tjaronn Chery – Kayserispor 2018–19
Mitchell Donald – Yeni Malatyaspor – 2018–
Ryan Donk – Kasımpaşa, Galatasaray 2013–16, 2017–
Leandro Kappel – Altay – 2021–

Sweden
 Kennet Andersson – Fenerbahçe 2000–02
 Mattias Asper – Beşiktaş 2002
 Ferhad Ayaz – Gaziantepspor 2015–16
Mattias Bjärsmyr – Sivasspor 2017–
Eric Björkander – Altay 2021–
Patrik Carlgren – Konyaspor 2017–
 Mervan Çelik – Gençlerbirliği, Akhisar Belediyespor 2013–17
 Johan Dahlin – Gençlerbirliği 2014
 Panajotis Dimitriadis – Gençlerbirliği 2015–16
 Jimmy Durmaz – Gençlerbirliği, Galatasaray, Fatih Karagümrük 2012–14, 2019–
 Johan Elmander – Galatasaray 2011–13
 Labinot Harbuzi – Gençlerbirliği , Manisaspor 2009–12
Samuel Holmén – İstanbul Büyükşehir Belediyespor, Fenerbahçe, Bursaspor, Konyaspor, İstanbul Başakşehir 2010–17
Sebastian Holmén – Çaykur Rizespor 2021–
 Johannes Hopf – Gençlerbirliği, MKE Ankaragücü 2015–19
 Andreas Isaksson – Kasımpaşa 2012–16
Mattias Johansson – Gençlerbirliği 2020–
Abdul Khalili – Mersin İdmanyurdu, Gençlerbirliği, Kasımpaşa 2014–20
 Isaac Kiese Thelin – Kasımpaşa 2020–
 Emir Kujović – Kayserispor, Elazığspor 2011–13
Daniel Larsson – Gaziantepspor, Akhisar Belediyespor 2015–
Tobias Linderoth – Galatasaray 2007–09
Roger Ljung – Galatasaray 1993–94
Roland Magnusson – Altay 1967–69
Alexander Milošević – Beşiktaş 2015–16
Kristoffer Nordfeldt – Gençlerbirliği 2019–
Jonathan Ring – Gençlerbirliği 2017
Fredrik Risp – Gençlerbirliği, Trabzonspor, Ankaraspor, MKE Ankaragücü 2005–09
Besard Sabovic – Kayserispor 2020–21
Adam Ståhl – Karabükspor – 2017–
Gustav Svensson – Bursaspor 2010–12
Erkan Zengin – Beşiktaş, Eskişehirspor, Trabzonspor 2008–16

Switzerland
Musa Araz – Konyaspor 2017–
Nassim Ben Khalifa – Eskişehirspor 2015
Eren Derdiyok – Kasımpaşa, Galatasaray, Göztepe 2014–20
Blerim Džemaili – Galatasaray 2014–15
Johan Djourou – Antalyaspor 2017–18
Michael Frey – Fenerbahçe 2018–19
Mario Gavranović – Kayserispor 2021–
Levent Gülen – Kayserispor 2013–14, 2016–20
Gökhan Inler – Beşiktaş, İstanbul Başakşehir, Adana Demirspor 2016–20, 2021–
Adrian Knup – Galatasaray 1996
Admir Mehmedi – Antalyaspor 2021–
François Moubandje – Alanyaspor, Göztepe 2020–
Ridge Munsy – Erzurumspor – 2018–19
Kubilay Türkyilmaz – Galatasaray 1993–95
Hakan Yakin – Galatasaray 2005
Murat Yakin – Fenerbahçe 1998–99
Reto Ziegler – Fenerbahçe 2011–13

Syria
 Sanharib Malki – Kasımpaşa 2013–16

Tanzania
Mbwana Samatta – Fenerbahçe 2020–

Togo
 Emmanuel Adebayor – İstanbul Başakşehir F.K., Kayserispor 2017–19
 Serge Akakpo – Trabzonspor 2016–17
Floyd Ayité – Gençlerbirliği 2019–
 Jonathan Ayité – Alanyaspor 2016–17
 Arafat Djako – Gaziantepspor 2011
Mathieu Dossevi – Denizlispor 2020–
 Hamílton – Ankaraspor 2007–08
 Franck Mawuena – Gençlerbirliği 2011–12
 Gilles Sunu – Erzurumspor 2018–20

Trinidad and Tobago
 John Bostock – Bursaspor – 2017–18
 Darryl Roberts – Denizlispor 2008–11

Tunisia
Aymen Abdennour – Kayserispor 2019–20
Zoubeir Baya – Beşiktaş 2001–02
Änis Ben-Hatira – Gaziantepspor 2017
Ayman Ben Mohamed – Denizlispor  2020–21
Mortadha Ben Ouanes – Kasımpaşa 2021–
Wissem Ben Yahia – Mersin İdmanyurdu 2011–13
Syam Ben Youssef – Kasımpaşa,  Denizlispor  2017–
Riadh Bouazizi – Bursaspor, Gaziantepspor, Kayseri Erciyesspor 2000–07
Ghailene Chaalali – Yeni Malatyaspor 2019–
Kaies Ghodhbane – Diyarbakırspor, Samsunspor, Konyaspor 2003–06
Oussama Haddadi – Kasımpaşa, Yeni Malatyaspor 2019–22
Mohamed Larbi – Samsunspor 2017–18
Sofiane Melliti – Gaziantepspor 2006
Yassine Meriah – Kasımpaşa 2019–
Al Fahem Riadh – Denizlispor 1987–88
Montassar Talbi – Çaykur Rizespor 2018–21
Nabil Taïder – Sivasspor 2009–10
Mohamed Ali Yacoubi – Çaykur Rizespor 2016–17
Ali Zitouni – Antalyaspor 2006–07, 2008–12

Turkmenistan
 Alexey Kozlov – Gençlerbirliği 1992–93
 Ravshan Mukhadov – Gençlerbirliği 1992–93
 Sergey Agashkov – MKE Ankaragücü 1993–94
 Charyar Mukhadov – MKE Ankaragücü 1993–94

Uganda
Farouk Miya – Konyaspor 2019–
Majid Musisi – Bursaspor, Çanakkale Dardanelspor 1994–96, 1997–99

Ukraine
 Serhiy Bezhenar – Erzurumspor 1999–2000
Andriy Bliznichenko – Karabükspor 2017–
Andriy Boryachuk – Çaykur Rizespor 2019–
 Denys Boyko – Beşiktaş 2016
 Bogdan Butko – BB Erzurumspor 2020–
Oleksandr Hladkyy – Çaykur Rizespor 2018–19
 Viktor Hryshko – Trabzonspor 1993–95
 Yuriy Kalitvintsev – Trabzonspor 1998–99
 Oleksandr Karavayev – Fenerbahçe 2016–17
Anton Kravchenko – Karabükspor 2017–
Artem Kravets – Kayserispor – 2017–
Oleksandr Kucher – Kayserispor 2017–
 Vladyslav Kulach – Eskişehirspor 2016
 Volodymyr Lyutyi – Bursaspor 1993
 Volodymyr Matsyhura – Kocaelispor 2000
 Artem Milevskyi – Gaziantepspor 2013
Mykola Morozyuk – Çaykur Rizespor 2018–
 Serhii Rebrov – Fenerbahçe 2003–04
Serhiy Rybalka – Sivasspor 2017–
Oleksandr Rybka – Karabükspor 2017–
Yevhen Seleznyov – Karabükspor, Akhisar Belediyespor 2017–
 Ivan Vyshnevskyi – Fenerbahçe, Sarıyer 1989–92

United States
Freddy Adu – Çaykur Rizespor 2010–11
Jozy Altidore – Bursaspor 2010–11
Tyler Boyd – Ankaragücü, Beşiktaş, Sivasspor, Çaykur Rizespor 2018–
Mix Diskerud – Denizlispor 2020–21
 Maurice Edu – Bursaspor 2012–13
 Brad Friedel – Galatasaray 1995–96
 Jermaine Jones – Beşiktaş 2013–14
Eric Lichaj – Fatih Karagümrük 2020–21
Haji Wright – Antalyaspor 2021–
DeAndre Yedlin – Galatasaray 2020–22

Uruguay
 Andrés Fleurquin – Galatasaray 2001–02
 Santiago García – Kasımpaşa 2012–13
 Andrés Lamas – MKE Ankaragücü 2007–08
 Mauricio Lemos – Fenerbahçe 2020–
 Diego Lugano – Fenerbahçe 2006–11
 Marcelo Méndez – Kayserispor 2006–07
 Sergio Órteman – İstanbul Büyükşehir Belediyespor 2007
Fernando Muslera – Galatasaray 2011–
 Pablo Pintos – Kasımpaşa 2012–13
Sergio Rochet – Sivasspor 2017–18
 Diego Rossi – Fenerbahçe 2021–
Marcelo Saracchi – Galatasaray 2019–21
David Texeira – Sivasspor 2015–16
Tabaré Viúdez – Kasımpaşa 2012–15
Marcelo Zalayeta – Kayserispor 2010–11

Uzbekistan
 Otabek Shukurov – Fatih Karagümrük 2022–

Venezuela
Wilker Ángel – Göztepe 2021–
Yonathan Del Valle – Kasımpaşa, Bursaspor 2015–17
Jhon Murillo – Kasımpaşa 2017–18
Gelmin Rivas – MKE Ankaragücü 2019–20
 Jobanny Rivero – Konyaspor 2005–06
 Renny Vega – Bursaspor, Denizlispor 2007–09
 Ronald Vargas – Balıkesirspor 2014–15

Wales
 Dean Saunders – Galatasaray 1995–96

Zambia
Evans Kangwa – Gaziantepspor 2016–
Chisamba Lungu – Alanyaspor 2017–
 Collins Mbesuma – Bursaspor 2007–08

Zimbabwe
Teenage Hadebe – Yeni Malatyaspor 2019–
Norman Mapeza – Galatasaray, MKE Ankaragücü, Altay, Çanakkale Dardanelspor, Malatyaspor 1994–2000, 2001–02
 Shingayi Kaondera – Gaziantepspor 2005–06
 Joseph Ngwenya – Antalyaspor 2008–09

References 
Turkish Football Federation.org
Mackolik.com
Worldfootball.net

Notes

 
 
Turkey
Association football player non-biographical articles
Association football in Turkey lists